

533001–533100 

|-bgcolor=#d6d6d6
| 533001 ||  || — || October 30, 2007 || Mount Lemmon || Mount Lemmon Survey ||  || align=right | 1.6 km || 
|-id=002 bgcolor=#E9E9E9
| 533002 ||  || — || March 3, 2005 || Catalina || CSS ||  || align=right | 2.0 km || 
|-id=003 bgcolor=#d6d6d6
| 533003 ||  || — || November 9, 2013 || Haleakala || Pan-STARRS ||  || align=right | 2.6 km || 
|-id=004 bgcolor=#d6d6d6
| 533004 ||  || — || October 24, 2013 || Kitt Peak || Spacewatch ||  || align=right | 3.2 km || 
|-id=005 bgcolor=#fefefe
| 533005 ||  || — || December 10, 2013 || Mount Lemmon || Mount Lemmon Survey || H || align=right data-sort-value="0.51" | 510 m || 
|-id=006 bgcolor=#FA8072
| 533006 ||  || — || December 4, 2013 || Haleakala || Pan-STARRS || H || align=right data-sort-value="0.62" | 620 m || 
|-id=007 bgcolor=#fefefe
| 533007 ||  || — || December 24, 2013 || Catalina || CSS || H || align=right data-sort-value="0.70" | 700 m || 
|-id=008 bgcolor=#d6d6d6
| 533008 ||  || — || January 1, 2014 || Kitt Peak || Spacewatch ||  || align=right | 2.5 km || 
|-id=009 bgcolor=#E9E9E9
| 533009 ||  || — || January 15, 2005 || Socorro || LINEAR ||  || align=right | 1.7 km || 
|-id=010 bgcolor=#d6d6d6
| 533010 ||  || — || October 20, 2007 || Kitt Peak || Spacewatch ||  || align=right | 1.8 km || 
|-id=011 bgcolor=#FFC2E0
| 533011 ||  || — || January 4, 2014 || Haleakala || Pan-STARRS || AMOPHAcritical || align=right data-sort-value="0.15" | 150 m || 
|-id=012 bgcolor=#fefefe
| 533012 ||  || — || January 3, 2014 || Catalina || CSS || H || align=right data-sort-value="0.66" | 660 m || 
|-id=013 bgcolor=#FA8072
| 533013 ||  || — || October 30, 2008 || Mount Lemmon || Mount Lemmon Survey || H || align=right data-sort-value="0.65" | 650 m || 
|-id=014 bgcolor=#fefefe
| 533014 ||  || — || January 4, 2014 || Haleakala || Pan-STARRS || H || align=right data-sort-value="0.51" | 510 m || 
|-id=015 bgcolor=#fefefe
| 533015 ||  || — || January 4, 2014 || Haleakala || Pan-STARRS || H || align=right data-sort-value="0.66" | 660 m || 
|-id=016 bgcolor=#fefefe
| 533016 ||  || — || January 6, 2014 || Haleakala || Pan-STARRS || H || align=right data-sort-value="0.62" | 620 m || 
|-id=017 bgcolor=#FA8072
| 533017 ||  || — || January 4, 2014 || Mount Lemmon || Mount Lemmon Survey || H || align=right data-sort-value="0.62" | 620 m || 
|-id=018 bgcolor=#E9E9E9
| 533018 ||  || — || October 10, 2012 || Mount Lemmon || Mount Lemmon Survey ||  || align=right | 1.8 km || 
|-id=019 bgcolor=#E9E9E9
| 533019 ||  || — || December 31, 2013 || Haleakala || Pan-STARRS ||  || align=right | 1.5 km || 
|-id=020 bgcolor=#fefefe
| 533020 ||  || — || December 25, 2013 || Mount Lemmon || Mount Lemmon Survey || H || align=right data-sort-value="0.72" | 720 m || 
|-id=021 bgcolor=#d6d6d6
| 533021 ||  || — || October 18, 2012 || Mount Lemmon || Mount Lemmon Survey ||  || align=right | 3.1 km || 
|-id=022 bgcolor=#d6d6d6
| 533022 ||  || — || January 9, 2014 || Haleakala || Pan-STARRS ||  || align=right | 3.0 km || 
|-id=023 bgcolor=#fefefe
| 533023 ||  || — || January 9, 2014 || Haleakala || Pan-STARRS || H || align=right data-sort-value="0.61" | 610 m || 
|-id=024 bgcolor=#E9E9E9
| 533024 ||  || — || October 28, 2013 || Mount Lemmon || Mount Lemmon Survey ||  || align=right | 1.4 km || 
|-id=025 bgcolor=#d6d6d6
| 533025 ||  || — || October 17, 2007 || Mount Lemmon || Mount Lemmon Survey ||  || align=right | 2.6 km || 
|-id=026 bgcolor=#d6d6d6
| 533026 ||  || — || February 7, 2008 || Socorro || LINEAR || Tj (2.94) || align=right | 3.4 km || 
|-id=027 bgcolor=#d6d6d6
| 533027 ||  || — || March 22, 2009 || Catalina || CSS ||  || align=right | 2.5 km || 
|-id=028 bgcolor=#C2E0FF
| 533028 ||  || — || January 26, 2011 || Haleakala || Pan-STARRS || res4:7 || align=right | 202 km || 
|-id=029 bgcolor=#FA8072
| 533029 ||  || — || January 7, 2014 || Kitt Peak || Spacewatch || H || align=right data-sort-value="0.52" | 520 m || 
|-id=030 bgcolor=#d6d6d6
| 533030 ||  || — || October 9, 2012 || Mount Lemmon || Mount Lemmon Survey ||  || align=right | 1.8 km || 
|-id=031 bgcolor=#d6d6d6
| 533031 ||  || — || July 28, 2011 || Haleakala || Pan-STARRS ||  || align=right | 2.4 km || 
|-id=032 bgcolor=#d6d6d6
| 533032 ||  || — || November 19, 2007 || Mount Lemmon || Mount Lemmon Survey ||  || align=right | 2.4 km || 
|-id=033 bgcolor=#d6d6d6
| 533033 ||  || — || February 24, 2009 || Mount Lemmon || Mount Lemmon Survey ||  || align=right | 3.2 km || 
|-id=034 bgcolor=#d6d6d6
| 533034 ||  || — || December 4, 2007 || Mount Lemmon || Mount Lemmon Survey ||  || align=right | 2.0 km || 
|-id=035 bgcolor=#d6d6d6
| 533035 ||  || — || August 27, 2012 || Haleakala || Pan-STARRS ||  || align=right | 1.9 km || 
|-id=036 bgcolor=#d6d6d6
| 533036 ||  || — || January 2, 2014 || Mount Lemmon || Mount Lemmon Survey ||  || align=right | 2.9 km || 
|-id=037 bgcolor=#E9E9E9
| 533037 ||  || — || January 1, 2014 || Haleakala || Pan-STARRS ||  || align=right | 2.1 km || 
|-id=038 bgcolor=#E9E9E9
| 533038 ||  || — || January 1, 2014 || Kitt Peak || Spacewatch ||  || align=right | 2.5 km || 
|-id=039 bgcolor=#d6d6d6
| 533039 ||  || — || December 31, 2008 || Kitt Peak || Spacewatch ||  || align=right | 2.2 km || 
|-id=040 bgcolor=#E9E9E9
| 533040 ||  || — || October 8, 2008 || Kitt Peak || Spacewatch ||  || align=right | 1.1 km || 
|-id=041 bgcolor=#d6d6d6
| 533041 ||  || — || August 28, 2005 || Kitt Peak || Spacewatch ||  || align=right | 2.8 km || 
|-id=042 bgcolor=#E9E9E9
| 533042 ||  || — || January 7, 2014 || Mount Lemmon || Mount Lemmon Survey ||  || align=right | 1.9 km || 
|-id=043 bgcolor=#E9E9E9
| 533043 ||  || — || January 9, 2014 || Mount Lemmon || Mount Lemmon Survey ||  || align=right | 1.9 km || 
|-id=044 bgcolor=#d6d6d6
| 533044 ||  || — || January 9, 2014 || Mount Lemmon || Mount Lemmon Survey || 7:4 || align=right | 2.4 km || 
|-id=045 bgcolor=#E9E9E9
| 533045 ||  || — || August 13, 2012 || Kitt Peak || Spacewatch ||  || align=right | 1.6 km || 
|-id=046 bgcolor=#E9E9E9
| 533046 ||  || — || September 24, 2012 || Mount Lemmon || Mount Lemmon Survey ||  || align=right | 1.4 km || 
|-id=047 bgcolor=#E9E9E9
| 533047 ||  || — || October 24, 2008 || Mount Lemmon || Mount Lemmon Survey ||  || align=right | 2.1 km || 
|-id=048 bgcolor=#E9E9E9
| 533048 ||  || — || November 20, 2008 || Mount Lemmon || Mount Lemmon Survey ||  || align=right | 1.1 km || 
|-id=049 bgcolor=#d6d6d6
| 533049 ||  || — || January 10, 2014 || Kitt Peak || Spacewatch ||  || align=right | 3.0 km || 
|-id=050 bgcolor=#E9E9E9
| 533050 ||  || — || January 1, 2014 || Haleakala || Pan-STARRS ||  || align=right | 1.9 km || 
|-id=051 bgcolor=#fefefe
| 533051 ||  || — || January 18, 2014 || Haleakala || Pan-STARRS || H || align=right data-sort-value="0.60" | 600 m || 
|-id=052 bgcolor=#E9E9E9
| 533052 ||  || — || March 4, 2005 || Kitt Peak || Spacewatch ||  || align=right | 2.0 km || 
|-id=053 bgcolor=#E9E9E9
| 533053 ||  || — || November 6, 2013 || Mount Lemmon || Mount Lemmon Survey ||  || align=right | 1.6 km || 
|-id=054 bgcolor=#E9E9E9
| 533054 ||  || — || February 13, 1997 || Kitt Peak || Spacewatch ||  || align=right | 1.1 km || 
|-id=055 bgcolor=#d6d6d6
| 533055 ||  || — || January 21, 2014 || Kitt Peak || Spacewatch ||  || align=right | 2.9 km || 
|-id=056 bgcolor=#d6d6d6
| 533056 ||  || — || December 4, 2013 || Haleakala || Pan-STARRS ||  || align=right | 3.0 km || 
|-id=057 bgcolor=#d6d6d6
| 533057 ||  || — || November 20, 2007 || Mount Lemmon || Mount Lemmon Survey ||  || align=right | 2.1 km || 
|-id=058 bgcolor=#E9E9E9
| 533058 ||  || — || January 1, 2014 || Haleakala || Pan-STARRS ||  || align=right | 2.0 km || 
|-id=059 bgcolor=#E9E9E9
| 533059 ||  || — || October 7, 2008 || Mount Lemmon || Mount Lemmon Survey ||  || align=right | 1.5 km || 
|-id=060 bgcolor=#d6d6d6
| 533060 ||  || — || October 31, 2013 || Mount Lemmon || Mount Lemmon Survey ||  || align=right | 1.8 km || 
|-id=061 bgcolor=#E9E9E9
| 533061 ||  || — || May 19, 2010 || Mount Lemmon || Mount Lemmon Survey ||  || align=right | 2.2 km || 
|-id=062 bgcolor=#E9E9E9
| 533062 ||  || — || December 25, 2013 || Kitt Peak || Spacewatch ||  || align=right | 1.6 km || 
|-id=063 bgcolor=#fefefe
| 533063 ||  || — || January 23, 2014 || Kitt Peak || Spacewatch || H || align=right data-sort-value="0.71" | 710 m || 
|-id=064 bgcolor=#d6d6d6
| 533064 ||  || — || December 13, 2013 || Mount Lemmon || Mount Lemmon Survey ||  || align=right | 2.3 km || 
|-id=065 bgcolor=#E9E9E9
| 533065 ||  || — || November 29, 1999 || Kitt Peak || Spacewatch ||  || align=right | 1.8 km || 
|-id=066 bgcolor=#d6d6d6
| 533066 ||  || — || December 25, 2013 || Kitt Peak || Spacewatch ||  || align=right | 2.9 km || 
|-id=067 bgcolor=#d6d6d6
| 533067 ||  || — || February 1, 2009 || Kitt Peak || Spacewatch || EMA || align=right | 2.7 km || 
|-id=068 bgcolor=#fefefe
| 533068 ||  || — || December 30, 2013 || Mount Lemmon || Mount Lemmon Survey || H || align=right data-sort-value="0.77" | 770 m || 
|-id=069 bgcolor=#d6d6d6
| 533069 ||  || — || December 13, 2013 || Mount Lemmon || Mount Lemmon Survey ||  || align=right | 3.1 km || 
|-id=070 bgcolor=#d6d6d6
| 533070 ||  || — || December 27, 2013 || Mount Lemmon || Mount Lemmon Survey ||  || align=right | 2.6 km || 
|-id=071 bgcolor=#fefefe
| 533071 ||  || — || June 21, 2012 || Mount Lemmon || Mount Lemmon Survey || H || align=right data-sort-value="0.62" | 620 m || 
|-id=072 bgcolor=#E9E9E9
| 533072 ||  || — || September 20, 2011 || Haleakala || Pan-STARRS ||  || align=right | 2.5 km || 
|-id=073 bgcolor=#d6d6d6
| 533073 ||  || — || September 20, 2012 || Mount Lemmon || Mount Lemmon Survey ||  || align=right | 2.7 km || 
|-id=074 bgcolor=#d6d6d6
| 533074 ||  || — || January 31, 2009 || Kitt Peak || Spacewatch ||  || align=right | 1.6 km || 
|-id=075 bgcolor=#d6d6d6
| 533075 ||  || — || January 23, 2014 || Catalina || CSS ||  || align=right | 3.2 km || 
|-id=076 bgcolor=#E9E9E9
| 533076 ||  || — || January 23, 2014 || Mount Lemmon || Mount Lemmon Survey ||  || align=right | 2.0 km || 
|-id=077 bgcolor=#d6d6d6
| 533077 ||  || — || September 14, 2007 || Mount Lemmon || Mount Lemmon Survey ||  || align=right | 1.9 km || 
|-id=078 bgcolor=#E9E9E9
| 533078 ||  || — || December 31, 2013 || Kitt Peak || Spacewatch ||  || align=right | 1.2 km || 
|-id=079 bgcolor=#d6d6d6
| 533079 ||  || — || January 2, 2014 || Kitt Peak || Spacewatch ||  || align=right | 2.9 km || 
|-id=080 bgcolor=#d6d6d6
| 533080 ||  || — || January 15, 2009 || Kitt Peak || Spacewatch ||  || align=right | 2.0 km || 
|-id=081 bgcolor=#E9E9E9
| 533081 ||  || — || April 9, 2010 || Kitt Peak || Spacewatch ||  || align=right | 1.7 km || 
|-id=082 bgcolor=#fefefe
| 533082 ||  || — || January 26, 2014 || Haleakala || Pan-STARRS || H || align=right data-sort-value="0.52" | 520 m || 
|-id=083 bgcolor=#fefefe
| 533083 ||  || — || January 12, 2014 || Mount Lemmon || Mount Lemmon Survey || H || align=right data-sort-value="0.81" | 810 m || 
|-id=084 bgcolor=#d6d6d6
| 533084 ||  || — || December 26, 2013 || XuYi || PMO NEO ||  || align=right | 3.3 km || 
|-id=085 bgcolor=#C2E0FF
| 533085 ||  || — || May 9, 2010 || Haleakala || Pan-STARRS || SDO || align=right | 222 km || 
|-id=086 bgcolor=#d6d6d6
| 533086 ||  || — || January 21, 2014 || Kitt Peak || Spacewatch ||  || align=right | 3.1 km || 
|-id=087 bgcolor=#E9E9E9
| 533087 ||  || — || March 9, 2005 || Mount Lemmon || Mount Lemmon Survey ||  || align=right | 1.6 km || 
|-id=088 bgcolor=#d6d6d6
| 533088 ||  || — || January 17, 2009 || Mount Lemmon || Mount Lemmon Survey ||  || align=right | 2.1 km || 
|-id=089 bgcolor=#E9E9E9
| 533089 ||  || — || June 22, 2010 || WISE || WISE ||  || align=right | 1.4 km || 
|-id=090 bgcolor=#d6d6d6
| 533090 ||  || — || October 15, 2012 || Haleakala || Pan-STARRS ||  || align=right | 2.2 km || 
|-id=091 bgcolor=#d6d6d6
| 533091 ||  || — || October 18, 2006 || Kitt Peak || Spacewatch ||  || align=right | 2.7 km || 
|-id=092 bgcolor=#d6d6d6
| 533092 ||  || — || August 31, 2011 || Haleakala || Pan-STARRS ||  || align=right | 2.8 km || 
|-id=093 bgcolor=#d6d6d6
| 533093 ||  || — || October 20, 2012 || Haleakala || Pan-STARRS ||  || align=right | 3.1 km || 
|-id=094 bgcolor=#d6d6d6
| 533094 ||  || — || January 28, 2014 || Mount Lemmon || Mount Lemmon Survey ||  || align=right | 2.8 km || 
|-id=095 bgcolor=#d6d6d6
| 533095 ||  || — || March 19, 2010 || Mount Lemmon || Mount Lemmon Survey ||  || align=right | 2.3 km || 
|-id=096 bgcolor=#d6d6d6
| 533096 ||  || — || January 21, 2014 || Mount Lemmon || Mount Lemmon Survey ||  || align=right | 2.4 km || 
|-id=097 bgcolor=#E9E9E9
| 533097 ||  || — || January 20, 2014 || Mount Lemmon || Mount Lemmon Survey ||  || align=right | 2.0 km || 
|-id=098 bgcolor=#E9E9E9
| 533098 ||  || — || October 11, 2012 || Haleakala || Pan-STARRS ||  || align=right | 1.7 km || 
|-id=099 bgcolor=#d6d6d6
| 533099 ||  || — || September 4, 2011 || Haleakala || Pan-STARRS ||  || align=right | 3.0 km || 
|-id=100 bgcolor=#E9E9E9
| 533100 ||  || — || January 10, 2014 || Mount Lemmon || Mount Lemmon Survey ||  || align=right | 1.4 km || 
|}

533101–533200 

|-bgcolor=#d6d6d6
| 533101 ||  || — || February 22, 2003 || Kitt Peak || Spacewatch ||  || align=right | 1.9 km || 
|-id=102 bgcolor=#d6d6d6
| 533102 ||  || — || October 17, 2012 || Mount Lemmon || Mount Lemmon Survey ||  || align=right | 2.2 km || 
|-id=103 bgcolor=#E9E9E9
| 533103 ||  || — || October 18, 2012 || Haleakala || Pan-STARRS ||  || align=right | 1.9 km || 
|-id=104 bgcolor=#E9E9E9
| 533104 ||  || — || January 26, 2014 || Haleakala || Pan-STARRS ||  || align=right | 1.4 km || 
|-id=105 bgcolor=#d6d6d6
| 533105 ||  || — || January 26, 2014 || Haleakala || Pan-STARRS ||  || align=right | 2.3 km || 
|-id=106 bgcolor=#d6d6d6
| 533106 ||  || — || January 28, 2014 || Mount Lemmon || Mount Lemmon Survey ||  || align=right | 3.0 km || 
|-id=107 bgcolor=#d6d6d6
| 533107 ||  || — || January 28, 2014 || Catalina || CSS ||  || align=right | 2.6 km || 
|-id=108 bgcolor=#d6d6d6
| 533108 ||  || — || January 28, 2014 || Kitt Peak || Spacewatch ||  || align=right | 2.4 km || 
|-id=109 bgcolor=#d6d6d6
| 533109 ||  || — || January 28, 2014 || Kitt Peak || Spacewatch ||  || align=right | 2.4 km || 
|-id=110 bgcolor=#d6d6d6
| 533110 ||  || — || March 21, 2009 || Mount Lemmon || Mount Lemmon Survey ||  || align=right | 1.8 km || 
|-id=111 bgcolor=#d6d6d6
| 533111 ||  || — || September 26, 2006 || Kitt Peak || Spacewatch ||  || align=right | 2.7 km || 
|-id=112 bgcolor=#d6d6d6
| 533112 ||  || — || February 2, 2010 || WISE || WISE ||  || align=right | 2.7 km || 
|-id=113 bgcolor=#E9E9E9
| 533113 ||  || — || December 24, 2013 || Catalina || CSS ||  || align=right | 1.4 km || 
|-id=114 bgcolor=#d6d6d6
| 533114 ||  || — || January 21, 2014 || Mount Lemmon || Mount Lemmon Survey ||  || align=right | 2.1 km || 
|-id=115 bgcolor=#E9E9E9
| 533115 ||  || — || July 26, 2011 || Haleakala || Pan-STARRS ||  || align=right | 1.9 km || 
|-id=116 bgcolor=#d6d6d6
| 533116 ||  || — || December 30, 2013 || Mount Lemmon || Mount Lemmon Survey ||  || align=right | 2.7 km || 
|-id=117 bgcolor=#d6d6d6
| 533117 ||  || — || February 22, 2009 || Kitt Peak || Spacewatch ||  || align=right | 2.0 km || 
|-id=118 bgcolor=#fefefe
| 533118 ||  || — || January 29, 2009 || Mount Lemmon || Mount Lemmon Survey || H || align=right data-sort-value="0.51" | 510 m || 
|-id=119 bgcolor=#d6d6d6
| 533119 ||  || — || February 19, 2009 || Kitt Peak || Spacewatch ||  || align=right | 2.4 km || 
|-id=120 bgcolor=#fefefe
| 533120 ||  || — || August 14, 2012 || La Sagra || OAM Obs. || H || align=right data-sort-value="0.77" | 770 m || 
|-id=121 bgcolor=#fefefe
| 533121 ||  || — || June 14, 2012 || Haleakala || Pan-STARRS || H || align=right data-sort-value="0.77" | 770 m || 
|-id=122 bgcolor=#d6d6d6
| 533122 ||  || — || December 13, 2013 || Mount Lemmon || Mount Lemmon Survey ||  || align=right | 3.1 km || 
|-id=123 bgcolor=#d6d6d6
| 533123 ||  || — || February 9, 2014 || Mount Lemmon || Mount Lemmon Survey ||  || align=right | 2.5 km || 
|-id=124 bgcolor=#d6d6d6
| 533124 ||  || — || February 9, 2014 || Haleakala || Pan-STARRS ||  || align=right | 3.3 km || 
|-id=125 bgcolor=#fefefe
| 533125 ||  || — || February 11, 2014 || Mount Lemmon || Mount Lemmon Survey || H || align=right data-sort-value="0.75" | 750 m || 
|-id=126 bgcolor=#fefefe
| 533126 ||  || — || February 9, 2014 || Haleakala || Pan-STARRS || H || align=right data-sort-value="0.58" | 580 m || 
|-id=127 bgcolor=#d6d6d6
| 533127 ||  || — || February 9, 2014 || Kitt Peak || Spacewatch ||  || align=right | 2.9 km || 
|-id=128 bgcolor=#E9E9E9
| 533128 ||  || — || May 12, 2010 || WISE || WISE ||  || align=right | 1.7 km || 
|-id=129 bgcolor=#d6d6d6
| 533129 ||  || — || September 15, 2006 || Kitt Peak || Spacewatch ||  || align=right | 2.4 km || 
|-id=130 bgcolor=#d6d6d6
| 533130 ||  || — || January 29, 2014 || Kitt Peak || Spacewatch ||  || align=right | 2.3 km || 
|-id=131 bgcolor=#d6d6d6
| 533131 ||  || — || December 16, 2007 || Mount Lemmon || Mount Lemmon Survey ||  || align=right | 2.4 km || 
|-id=132 bgcolor=#d6d6d6
| 533132 ||  || — || January 31, 2009 || Mount Lemmon || Mount Lemmon Survey ||  || align=right | 2.5 km || 
|-id=133 bgcolor=#d6d6d6
| 533133 ||  || — || July 28, 2011 || Haleakala || Pan-STARRS ||  || align=right | 3.3 km || 
|-id=134 bgcolor=#d6d6d6
| 533134 ||  || — || December 31, 2007 || Kitt Peak || Spacewatch ||  || align=right | 2.4 km || 
|-id=135 bgcolor=#d6d6d6
| 533135 ||  || — || August 27, 2011 || Haleakala || Pan-STARRS ||  || align=right | 2.5 km || 
|-id=136 bgcolor=#d6d6d6
| 533136 ||  || — || November 4, 2007 || Kitt Peak || Spacewatch ||  || align=right | 2.1 km || 
|-id=137 bgcolor=#E9E9E9
| 533137 ||  || — || February 10, 2014 || Haleakala || Pan-STARRS ||  || align=right | 1.7 km || 
|-id=138 bgcolor=#d6d6d6
| 533138 ||  || — || March 3, 2009 || Mount Lemmon || Mount Lemmon Survey ||  || align=right | 2.4 km || 
|-id=139 bgcolor=#d6d6d6
| 533139 ||  || — || March 2, 2009 || Kitt Peak || Spacewatch ||  || align=right | 2.7 km || 
|-id=140 bgcolor=#E9E9E9
| 533140 ||  || — || February 14, 2005 || Kitt Peak || Spacewatch ||  || align=right | 1.9 km || 
|-id=141 bgcolor=#d6d6d6
| 533141 ||  || — || January 2, 2014 || Mount Lemmon || Mount Lemmon Survey ||  || align=right | 2.0 km || 
|-id=142 bgcolor=#d6d6d6
| 533142 ||  || — || February 17, 2010 || WISE || WISE ||  || align=right | 2.7 km || 
|-id=143 bgcolor=#E9E9E9
| 533143 ||  || — || February 10, 2014 || Haleakala || Pan-STARRS ||  || align=right | 1.6 km || 
|-id=144 bgcolor=#d6d6d6
| 533144 ||  || — || January 13, 2008 || Kitt Peak || Spacewatch ||  || align=right | 2.3 km || 
|-id=145 bgcolor=#fefefe
| 533145 ||  || — || January 7, 2014 || Mount Lemmon || Mount Lemmon Survey || H || align=right data-sort-value="0.54" | 540 m || 
|-id=146 bgcolor=#d6d6d6
| 533146 ||  || — || March 3, 2009 || Kitt Peak || Spacewatch ||  || align=right | 1.7 km || 
|-id=147 bgcolor=#fefefe
| 533147 ||  || — || July 15, 2012 || Siding Spring || SSS || H || align=right data-sort-value="0.72" | 720 m || 
|-id=148 bgcolor=#d6d6d6
| 533148 ||  || — || February 10, 2014 || Haleakala || Pan-STARRS ||  || align=right | 2.7 km || 
|-id=149 bgcolor=#E9E9E9
| 533149 ||  || — || August 28, 2006 || Kitt Peak || Spacewatch ||  || align=right | 2.3 km || 
|-id=150 bgcolor=#E9E9E9
| 533150 ||  || — || September 26, 2012 || Haleakala || Pan-STARRS ||  || align=right | 1.5 km || 
|-id=151 bgcolor=#fefefe
| 533151 ||  || — || January 24, 2014 || Haleakala || Pan-STARRS ||  || align=right data-sort-value="0.64" | 640 m || 
|-id=152 bgcolor=#fefefe
| 533152 ||  || — || February 22, 2014 || Haleakala || Pan-STARRS || H || align=right data-sort-value="0.67" | 670 m || 
|-id=153 bgcolor=#d6d6d6
| 533153 ||  || — || September 17, 2012 || Kitt Peak || Spacewatch ||  || align=right | 2.5 km || 
|-id=154 bgcolor=#d6d6d6
| 533154 ||  || — || February 9, 2014 || Haleakala || Pan-STARRS ||  || align=right | 3.2 km || 
|-id=155 bgcolor=#d6d6d6
| 533155 ||  || — || April 22, 2009 || Mount Lemmon || Mount Lemmon Survey ||  || align=right | 1.8 km || 
|-id=156 bgcolor=#d6d6d6
| 533156 ||  || — || September 4, 2011 || Haleakala || Pan-STARRS ||  || align=right | 2.8 km || 
|-id=157 bgcolor=#d6d6d6
| 533157 ||  || — || August 29, 2006 || Kitt Peak || Spacewatch || Tj (2.97) || align=right | 3.5 km || 
|-id=158 bgcolor=#d6d6d6
| 533158 ||  || — || January 28, 2014 || Mount Lemmon || Mount Lemmon Survey ||  || align=right | 3.3 km || 
|-id=159 bgcolor=#fefefe
| 533159 ||  || — || February 24, 2014 || Haleakala || Pan-STARRS || H || align=right data-sort-value="0.56" | 560 m || 
|-id=160 bgcolor=#E9E9E9
| 533160 ||  || — || March 10, 2005 || Mount Lemmon || Mount Lemmon Survey ||  || align=right | 1.7 km || 
|-id=161 bgcolor=#E9E9E9
| 533161 ||  || — || May 13, 2010 || Kitt Peak || Spacewatch ||  || align=right | 1.9 km || 
|-id=162 bgcolor=#d6d6d6
| 533162 ||  || — || February 10, 2014 || Haleakala || Pan-STARRS ||  || align=right | 2.6 km || 
|-id=163 bgcolor=#E9E9E9
| 533163 ||  || — || September 4, 2011 || Haleakala || Pan-STARRS ||  || align=right | 2.3 km || 
|-id=164 bgcolor=#d6d6d6
| 533164 ||  || — || September 25, 2006 || Kitt Peak || Spacewatch ||  || align=right | 2.3 km || 
|-id=165 bgcolor=#d6d6d6
| 533165 ||  || — || February 16, 2004 || Kitt Peak || Spacewatch ||  || align=right | 2.3 km || 
|-id=166 bgcolor=#d6d6d6
| 533166 ||  || — || September 23, 2011 || Mount Lemmon || Mount Lemmon Survey ||  || align=right | 2.6 km || 
|-id=167 bgcolor=#d6d6d6
| 533167 ||  || — || December 3, 2007 || Kitt Peak || Spacewatch ||  || align=right | 1.9 km || 
|-id=168 bgcolor=#E9E9E9
| 533168 ||  || — || February 1, 2009 || Mount Lemmon || Mount Lemmon Survey ||  || align=right | 1.7 km || 
|-id=169 bgcolor=#d6d6d6
| 533169 ||  || — || October 15, 2006 || Kitt Peak || Spacewatch ||  || align=right | 2.0 km || 
|-id=170 bgcolor=#d6d6d6
| 533170 ||  || — || January 16, 2008 || Mount Lemmon || Mount Lemmon Survey ||  || align=right | 2.0 km || 
|-id=171 bgcolor=#E9E9E9
| 533171 ||  || — || February 14, 2005 || Kitt Peak || Spacewatch ||  || align=right | 1.2 km || 
|-id=172 bgcolor=#d6d6d6
| 533172 ||  || — || November 11, 2007 || Mount Lemmon || Mount Lemmon Survey || THM || align=right | 2.0 km || 
|-id=173 bgcolor=#E9E9E9
| 533173 ||  || — || September 26, 2011 || Mount Lemmon || Mount Lemmon Survey || GEF || align=right | 1.1 km || 
|-id=174 bgcolor=#d6d6d6
| 533174 ||  || — || April 21, 2009 || Mount Lemmon || Mount Lemmon Survey ||  || align=right | 2.2 km || 
|-id=175 bgcolor=#E9E9E9
| 533175 ||  || — || February 4, 2009 || Mount Lemmon || Mount Lemmon Survey ||  || align=right | 1.8 km || 
|-id=176 bgcolor=#d6d6d6
| 533176 ||  || — || May 14, 2009 || Mount Lemmon || Mount Lemmon Survey ||  || align=right | 2.3 km || 
|-id=177 bgcolor=#d6d6d6
| 533177 ||  || — || February 26, 2014 || Haleakala || Pan-STARRS ||  || align=right | 2.5 km || 
|-id=178 bgcolor=#d6d6d6
| 533178 ||  || — || January 29, 2009 || Mount Lemmon || Mount Lemmon Survey ||  || align=right | 2.2 km || 
|-id=179 bgcolor=#d6d6d6
| 533179 ||  || — || February 10, 2014 || Haleakala || Pan-STARRS ||  || align=right | 3.3 km || 
|-id=180 bgcolor=#FA8072
| 533180 ||  || — || February 9, 2014 || Haleakala || Pan-STARRS || H || align=right data-sort-value="0.60" | 600 m || 
|-id=181 bgcolor=#d6d6d6
| 533181 ||  || — || February 10, 2014 || Haleakala || Pan-STARRS || 7:4 || align=right | 3.5 km || 
|-id=182 bgcolor=#d6d6d6
| 533182 ||  || — || April 26, 2009 || Kitt Peak || Spacewatch || THM || align=right | 2.0 km || 
|-id=183 bgcolor=#E9E9E9
| 533183 ||  || — || September 24, 2011 || Mount Lemmon || Mount Lemmon Survey ||  || align=right | 2.0 km || 
|-id=184 bgcolor=#d6d6d6
| 533184 ||  || — || March 3, 2009 || Mount Lemmon || Mount Lemmon Survey ||  || align=right | 2.2 km || 
|-id=185 bgcolor=#d6d6d6
| 533185 ||  || — || January 31, 2009 || Kitt Peak || Spacewatch ||  || align=right | 2.1 km || 
|-id=186 bgcolor=#fefefe
| 533186 ||  || — || February 26, 2014 || Mount Lemmon || Mount Lemmon Survey || H || align=right data-sort-value="0.56" | 560 m || 
|-id=187 bgcolor=#d6d6d6
| 533187 ||  || — || September 23, 2011 || Haleakala || Pan-STARRS ||  || align=right | 2.8 km || 
|-id=188 bgcolor=#d6d6d6
| 533188 ||  || — || February 27, 2009 || Kitt Peak || Spacewatch ||  || align=right | 2.0 km || 
|-id=189 bgcolor=#E9E9E9
| 533189 ||  || — || December 31, 2008 || Kitt Peak || Spacewatch || AGN || align=right data-sort-value="0.98" | 980 m || 
|-id=190 bgcolor=#d6d6d6
| 533190 ||  || — || April 5, 2003 || Kitt Peak || Spacewatch ||  || align=right | 3.0 km || 
|-id=191 bgcolor=#fefefe
| 533191 ||  || — || February 5, 2009 || Mount Lemmon || Mount Lemmon Survey || H || align=right data-sort-value="0.65" | 650 m || 
|-id=192 bgcolor=#fefefe
| 533192 ||  || — || September 13, 2007 || Catalina || CSS || H || align=right data-sort-value="0.57" | 570 m || 
|-id=193 bgcolor=#E9E9E9
| 533193 ||  || — || February 26, 2014 || Haleakala || Pan-STARRS ||  || align=right | 2.6 km || 
|-id=194 bgcolor=#d6d6d6
| 533194 ||  || — || February 10, 2014 || Haleakala || Pan-STARRS ||  || align=right | 2.5 km || 
|-id=195 bgcolor=#d6d6d6
| 533195 ||  || — || March 31, 2009 || Mount Lemmon || Mount Lemmon Survey ||  || align=right | 2.1 km || 
|-id=196 bgcolor=#E9E9E9
| 533196 ||  || — || October 22, 2012 || Haleakala || Pan-STARRS ||  || align=right | 1.7 km || 
|-id=197 bgcolor=#E9E9E9
| 533197 ||  || — || August 24, 2011 || Haleakala || Pan-STARRS ||  || align=right | 1.7 km || 
|-id=198 bgcolor=#d6d6d6
| 533198 ||  || — || February 22, 2014 || Kitt Peak || Spacewatch ||  || align=right | 2.9 km || 
|-id=199 bgcolor=#d6d6d6
| 533199 ||  || — || February 8, 2008 || Mount Lemmon || Mount Lemmon Survey ||  || align=right | 2.6 km || 
|-id=200 bgcolor=#d6d6d6
| 533200 ||  || — || March 31, 2009 || Mount Lemmon || Mount Lemmon Survey ||  || align=right | 2.2 km || 
|}

533201–533300 

|-bgcolor=#d6d6d6
| 533201 ||  || — || April 11, 2010 || WISE || WISE ||  || align=right | 2.0 km || 
|-id=202 bgcolor=#d6d6d6
| 533202 ||  || — || February 28, 2014 || Haleakala || Pan-STARRS ||  || align=right | 2.5 km || 
|-id=203 bgcolor=#d6d6d6
| 533203 ||  || — || February 27, 2009 || Kitt Peak || Spacewatch || Tj (2.99) || align=right | 2.7 km || 
|-id=204 bgcolor=#E9E9E9
| 533204 ||  || — || February 2, 2005 || Kitt Peak || Spacewatch ||  || align=right | 2.4 km || 
|-id=205 bgcolor=#C2E0FF
| 533205 ||  || — || March 9, 2011 || Haleakala || Pan-STARRS || cubewano (cold) || align=right | 267 km || 
|-id=206 bgcolor=#C2E0FF
| 533206 ||  || — || March 11, 2011 || Haleakala || Pan-STARRS || cubewano (hot)critical || align=right | 276 km || 
|-id=207 bgcolor=#C2E0FF
| 533207 ||  || — || April 3, 2011 || Haleakala || Pan-STARRS || cubewano (hot)critical || align=right | 213 km || 
|-id=208 bgcolor=#C2E0FF
| 533208 ||  || — || June 30, 2010 || Haleakala || Pan-STARRS || SDOcritical || align=right | 172 km || 
|-id=209 bgcolor=#C2E0FF
| 533209 ||  || — || March 13, 2011 || Haleakala || Pan-STARRS || plutinocritical || align=right | 321 km || 
|-id=210 bgcolor=#C2E0FF
| 533210 ||  || — || April 3, 2011 || Haleakala || Pan-STARRS || SDOcritical || align=right | 179 km || 
|-id=211 bgcolor=#C2E0FF
| 533211 ||  || — || July 1, 2010 || Haleakala || Pan-STARRS || res3:4 || align=right | 202 km || 
|-id=212 bgcolor=#fefefe
| 533212 ||  || — || November 13, 2007 || Mount Lemmon || Mount Lemmon Survey || H || align=right data-sort-value="0.61" | 610 m || 
|-id=213 bgcolor=#fefefe
| 533213 ||  || — || September 12, 2007 || Catalina || CSS || H || align=right data-sort-value="0.61" | 610 m || 
|-id=214 bgcolor=#E9E9E9
| 533214 ||  || — || May 6, 2005 || Catalina || CSS ||  || align=right | 1.9 km || 
|-id=215 bgcolor=#d6d6d6
| 533215 ||  || — || February 28, 2014 || Haleakala || Pan-STARRS ||  || align=right | 2.7 km || 
|-id=216 bgcolor=#d6d6d6
| 533216 ||  || — || May 19, 2010 || WISE || WISE ||  || align=right | 2.8 km || 
|-id=217 bgcolor=#E9E9E9
| 533217 ||  || — || February 22, 2014 || Kitt Peak || Spacewatch ||  || align=right | 1.9 km || 
|-id=218 bgcolor=#d6d6d6
| 533218 ||  || — || October 4, 2006 || Mount Lemmon || Mount Lemmon Survey ||  || align=right | 3.1 km || 
|-id=219 bgcolor=#d6d6d6
| 533219 ||  || — || October 1, 2006 || Kitt Peak || Spacewatch ||  || align=right | 2.7 km || 
|-id=220 bgcolor=#d6d6d6
| 533220 ||  || — || October 2, 2006 || Mount Lemmon || Mount Lemmon Survey ||  || align=right | 2.5 km || 
|-id=221 bgcolor=#d6d6d6
| 533221 ||  || — || April 22, 2009 || Kitt Peak || Spacewatch ||  || align=right | 2.9 km || 
|-id=222 bgcolor=#d6d6d6
| 533222 ||  || — || February 28, 2014 || Mount Lemmon || Mount Lemmon Survey ||  || align=right | 2.7 km || 
|-id=223 bgcolor=#d6d6d6
| 533223 ||  || — || September 30, 2006 || Mount Lemmon || Mount Lemmon Survey ||  || align=right | 2.7 km || 
|-id=224 bgcolor=#d6d6d6
| 533224 ||  || — || September 15, 2006 || Kitt Peak || Spacewatch ||  || align=right | 2.2 km || 
|-id=225 bgcolor=#E9E9E9
| 533225 ||  || — || April 15, 2010 || Mount Lemmon || Mount Lemmon Survey ||  || align=right | 2.3 km || 
|-id=226 bgcolor=#d6d6d6
| 533226 ||  || — || November 18, 2007 || Mount Lemmon || Mount Lemmon Survey ||  || align=right | 1.8 km || 
|-id=227 bgcolor=#E9E9E9
| 533227 ||  || — || October 12, 2007 || Mount Lemmon || Mount Lemmon Survey ||  || align=right | 2.1 km || 
|-id=228 bgcolor=#d6d6d6
| 533228 ||  || — || September 4, 2011 || Haleakala || Pan-STARRS ||  || align=right | 3.1 km || 
|-id=229 bgcolor=#d6d6d6
| 533229 ||  || — || January 9, 2013 || Mount Lemmon || Mount Lemmon Survey ||  || align=right | 3.0 km || 
|-id=230 bgcolor=#d6d6d6
| 533230 ||  || — || January 13, 2008 || Mount Lemmon || Mount Lemmon Survey ||  || align=right | 2.6 km || 
|-id=231 bgcolor=#d6d6d6
| 533231 ||  || — || February 26, 2014 || Haleakala || Pan-STARRS ||  || align=right | 2.6 km || 
|-id=232 bgcolor=#d6d6d6
| 533232 ||  || — || February 27, 2014 || Kitt Peak || Spacewatch || 7:4 || align=right | 3.2 km || 
|-id=233 bgcolor=#d6d6d6
| 533233 ||  || — || December 17, 2007 || Mount Lemmon || Mount Lemmon Survey ||  || align=right | 2.5 km || 
|-id=234 bgcolor=#d6d6d6
| 533234 ||  || — || January 13, 2008 || Mount Lemmon || Mount Lemmon Survey ||  || align=right | 2.6 km || 
|-id=235 bgcolor=#d6d6d6
| 533235 ||  || — || June 10, 2010 || WISE || WISE ||  || align=right | 5.3 km || 
|-id=236 bgcolor=#d6d6d6
| 533236 ||  || — || October 31, 2011 || Mount Lemmon || Mount Lemmon Survey ||  || align=right | 2.5 km || 
|-id=237 bgcolor=#d6d6d6
| 533237 ||  || — || September 4, 2011 || Haleakala || Pan-STARRS ||  || align=right | 2.7 km || 
|-id=238 bgcolor=#d6d6d6
| 533238 ||  || — || March 21, 2009 || Catalina || CSS ||  || align=right | 1.8 km || 
|-id=239 bgcolor=#d6d6d6
| 533239 ||  || — || February 27, 2009 || Kitt Peak || Spacewatch ||  || align=right | 2.2 km || 
|-id=240 bgcolor=#d6d6d6
| 533240 ||  || — || February 26, 2014 || Haleakala || Pan-STARRS ||  || align=right | 3.0 km || 
|-id=241 bgcolor=#d6d6d6
| 533241 ||  || — || December 12, 2012 || Mount Lemmon || Mount Lemmon Survey ||  || align=right | 2.5 km || 
|-id=242 bgcolor=#d6d6d6
| 533242 ||  || — || September 26, 2011 || Mount Lemmon || Mount Lemmon Survey ||  || align=right | 2.2 km || 
|-id=243 bgcolor=#E9E9E9
| 533243 ||  || — || February 2, 2005 || Kitt Peak || Spacewatch ||  || align=right | 2.0 km || 
|-id=244 bgcolor=#d6d6d6
| 533244 ||  || — || September 19, 2011 || Haleakala || Pan-STARRS ||  || align=right | 2.6 km || 
|-id=245 bgcolor=#d6d6d6
| 533245 ||  || — || January 19, 2008 || Mount Lemmon || Mount Lemmon Survey ||  || align=right | 2.4 km || 
|-id=246 bgcolor=#d6d6d6
| 533246 ||  || — || March 9, 2003 || Kitt Peak || Spacewatch ||  || align=right | 2.6 km || 
|-id=247 bgcolor=#d6d6d6
| 533247 ||  || — || March 1, 2009 || Kitt Peak || Spacewatch ||  || align=right | 2.3 km || 
|-id=248 bgcolor=#d6d6d6
| 533248 ||  || — || February 2, 2009 || Mount Lemmon || Mount Lemmon Survey ||  || align=right | 3.0 km || 
|-id=249 bgcolor=#E9E9E9
| 533249 ||  || — || April 2, 2005 || Mount Lemmon || Mount Lemmon Survey ||  || align=right | 1.7 km || 
|-id=250 bgcolor=#d6d6d6
| 533250 ||  || — || February 28, 2009 || Kitt Peak || Spacewatch ||  || align=right | 1.9 km || 
|-id=251 bgcolor=#d6d6d6
| 533251 ||  || — || February 28, 2014 || Haleakala || Pan-STARRS ||  || align=right | 2.0 km || 
|-id=252 bgcolor=#d6d6d6
| 533252 ||  || — || February 28, 2014 || Haleakala || Pan-STARRS ||  || align=right | 2.2 km || 
|-id=253 bgcolor=#d6d6d6
| 533253 ||  || — || February 28, 2014 || Haleakala || Pan-STARRS ||  || align=right | 2.1 km || 
|-id=254 bgcolor=#d6d6d6
| 533254 ||  || — || October 26, 2011 || Haleakala || Pan-STARRS ||  || align=right | 3.1 km || 
|-id=255 bgcolor=#d6d6d6
| 533255 ||  || — || February 28, 2014 || Haleakala || Pan-STARRS ||  || align=right | 2.4 km || 
|-id=256 bgcolor=#d6d6d6
| 533256 ||  || — || February 24, 2014 || Haleakala || Pan-STARRS ||  || align=right | 2.8 km || 
|-id=257 bgcolor=#d6d6d6
| 533257 ||  || — || February 26, 2014 || Mount Lemmon || Mount Lemmon Survey ||  || align=right | 2.6 km || 
|-id=258 bgcolor=#d6d6d6
| 533258 ||  || — || September 28, 2006 || Kitt Peak || Spacewatch ||  || align=right | 2.8 km || 
|-id=259 bgcolor=#d6d6d6
| 533259 ||  || — || February 26, 2014 || Haleakala || Pan-STARRS ||  || align=right | 2.6 km || 
|-id=260 bgcolor=#d6d6d6
| 533260 ||  || — || May 14, 2004 || Kitt Peak || Spacewatch ||  || align=right | 2.7 km || 
|-id=261 bgcolor=#E9E9E9
| 533261 ||  || — || April 7, 2005 || Kitt Peak || Spacewatch ||  || align=right | 2.1 km || 
|-id=262 bgcolor=#d6d6d6
| 533262 ||  || — || September 19, 2011 || Mount Lemmon || Mount Lemmon Survey ||  || align=right | 3.0 km || 
|-id=263 bgcolor=#E9E9E9
| 533263 ||  || — || February 28, 2014 || Haleakala || Pan-STARRS ||  || align=right | 2.0 km || 
|-id=264 bgcolor=#E9E9E9
| 533264 ||  || — || October 4, 1999 || Kitt Peak || Spacewatch ||  || align=right | 1.0 km || 
|-id=265 bgcolor=#E9E9E9
| 533265 ||  || — || November 3, 2007 || Mount Lemmon || Mount Lemmon Survey ||  || align=right | 1.8 km || 
|-id=266 bgcolor=#E9E9E9
| 533266 ||  || — || February 28, 2014 || Haleakala || Pan-STARRS ||  || align=right | 2.0 km || 
|-id=267 bgcolor=#d6d6d6
| 533267 ||  || — || March 1, 2009 || Kitt Peak || Spacewatch || KOR || align=right | 1.3 km || 
|-id=268 bgcolor=#FA8072
| 533268 ||  || — || September 13, 2007 || Kitt Peak || Spacewatch || H || align=right data-sort-value="0.54" | 540 m || 
|-id=269 bgcolor=#fefefe
| 533269 ||  || — || October 7, 2004 || Kitt Peak || Spacewatch || H || align=right data-sort-value="0.57" | 570 m || 
|-id=270 bgcolor=#fefefe
| 533270 ||  || — || February 20, 2014 || Haleakala || Pan-STARRS || H || align=right data-sort-value="0.63" | 630 m || 
|-id=271 bgcolor=#d6d6d6
| 533271 ||  || — || February 25, 2014 || Kitt Peak || Spacewatch ||  || align=right | 2.1 km || 
|-id=272 bgcolor=#fefefe
| 533272 ||  || — || February 15, 2001 || Socorro || LINEAR || H || align=right data-sort-value="0.78" | 780 m || 
|-id=273 bgcolor=#fefefe
| 533273 ||  || — || March 5, 2014 || Kitt Peak || Spacewatch ||  || align=right data-sort-value="0.69" | 690 m || 
|-id=274 bgcolor=#d6d6d6
| 533274 ||  || — || March 15, 2004 || Kitt Peak || Spacewatch ||  || align=right | 2.9 km || 
|-id=275 bgcolor=#E9E9E9
| 533275 ||  || — || January 1, 2009 || Kitt Peak || Spacewatch ||  || align=right | 2.3 km || 
|-id=276 bgcolor=#d6d6d6
| 533276 ||  || — || February 26, 2014 || Mount Lemmon || Mount Lemmon Survey ||  || align=right | 3.6 km || 
|-id=277 bgcolor=#d6d6d6
| 533277 ||  || — || March 17, 2009 || Kitt Peak || Spacewatch ||  || align=right | 2.2 km || 
|-id=278 bgcolor=#d6d6d6
| 533278 ||  || — || February 8, 2008 || Mount Lemmon || Mount Lemmon Survey || THM || align=right | 2.1 km || 
|-id=279 bgcolor=#fefefe
| 533279 ||  || — || March 9, 2014 || Haleakala || Pan-STARRS || H || align=right data-sort-value="0.54" | 540 m || 
|-id=280 bgcolor=#fefefe
| 533280 ||  || — || February 21, 2014 || Haleakala || Pan-STARRS || H || align=right data-sort-value="0.86" | 860 m || 
|-id=281 bgcolor=#E9E9E9
| 533281 ||  || — || October 8, 2012 || Haleakala || Pan-STARRS ||  || align=right | 2.0 km || 
|-id=282 bgcolor=#d6d6d6
| 533282 ||  || — || December 6, 2012 || Mount Lemmon || Mount Lemmon Survey ||  || align=right | 2.4 km || 
|-id=283 bgcolor=#d6d6d6
| 533283 ||  || — || January 10, 2008 || Kitt Peak || Spacewatch ||  || align=right | 2.4 km || 
|-id=284 bgcolor=#FA8072
| 533284 ||  || — || October 17, 2010 || Catalina || CSS || H || align=right data-sort-value="0.62" | 620 m || 
|-id=285 bgcolor=#d6d6d6
| 533285 ||  || — || November 7, 2007 || Kitt Peak || Spacewatch ||  || align=right | 2.0 km || 
|-id=286 bgcolor=#d6d6d6
| 533286 ||  || — || April 30, 2009 || Mount Lemmon || Mount Lemmon Survey || EOS || align=right | 1.5 km || 
|-id=287 bgcolor=#fefefe
| 533287 ||  || — || May 29, 2012 || Mount Lemmon || Mount Lemmon Survey || H || align=right data-sort-value="0.71" | 710 m || 
|-id=288 bgcolor=#d6d6d6
| 533288 ||  || — || November 18, 2006 || Mount Lemmon || Mount Lemmon Survey ||  || align=right | 3.4 km || 
|-id=289 bgcolor=#d6d6d6
| 533289 ||  || — || April 18, 2009 || Kitt Peak || Spacewatch ||  || align=right | 2.4 km || 
|-id=290 bgcolor=#d6d6d6
| 533290 ||  || — || January 20, 2008 || Mount Lemmon || Mount Lemmon Survey || Tj (2.99) || align=right | 3.2 km || 
|-id=291 bgcolor=#d6d6d6
| 533291 ||  || — || February 3, 2009 || Mount Lemmon || Mount Lemmon Survey ||  || align=right | 1.7 km || 
|-id=292 bgcolor=#E9E9E9
| 533292 ||  || — || October 12, 2007 || Mount Lemmon || Mount Lemmon Survey ||  || align=right | 2.0 km || 
|-id=293 bgcolor=#d6d6d6
| 533293 ||  || — || March 3, 1997 || Kitt Peak || Spacewatch ||  || align=right | 2.9 km || 
|-id=294 bgcolor=#d6d6d6
| 533294 ||  || — || August 4, 2011 || Haleakala || Pan-STARRS ||  || align=right | 2.8 km || 
|-id=295 bgcolor=#d6d6d6
| 533295 ||  || — || September 24, 2005 || Kitt Peak || Spacewatch ||  || align=right | 3.3 km || 
|-id=296 bgcolor=#d6d6d6
| 533296 ||  || — || November 14, 2012 || Mount Lemmon || Mount Lemmon Survey ||  || align=right | 1.9 km || 
|-id=297 bgcolor=#E9E9E9
| 533297 ||  || — || January 20, 2009 || Mount Lemmon || Mount Lemmon Survey ||  || align=right | 2.0 km || 
|-id=298 bgcolor=#d6d6d6
| 533298 ||  || — || February 28, 2014 || Haleakala || Pan-STARRS ||  || align=right | 2.7 km || 
|-id=299 bgcolor=#d6d6d6
| 533299 ||  || — || September 9, 2011 || Kitt Peak || Spacewatch ||  || align=right | 2.5 km || 
|-id=300 bgcolor=#d6d6d6
| 533300 ||  || — || October 20, 2006 || Mount Lemmon || Mount Lemmon Survey ||  || align=right | 2.7 km || 
|}

533301–533400 

|-bgcolor=#d6d6d6
| 533301 ||  || — || September 22, 2001 || Kitt Peak || Spacewatch ||  || align=right | 2.4 km || 
|-id=302 bgcolor=#d6d6d6
| 533302 ||  || — || September 24, 2006 || Kitt Peak || Spacewatch ||  || align=right | 2.2 km || 
|-id=303 bgcolor=#d6d6d6
| 533303 ||  || — || October 3, 2006 || Mount Lemmon || Mount Lemmon Survey ||  || align=right | 3.4 km || 
|-id=304 bgcolor=#d6d6d6
| 533304 ||  || — || January 11, 2008 || Kitt Peak || Spacewatch ||  || align=right | 2.7 km || 
|-id=305 bgcolor=#d6d6d6
| 533305 ||  || — || March 19, 2009 || Kitt Peak || Spacewatch ||  || align=right | 2.6 km || 
|-id=306 bgcolor=#d6d6d6
| 533306 ||  || — || April 20, 2003 || Anderson Mesa || LONEOS ||  || align=right | 3.9 km || 
|-id=307 bgcolor=#d6d6d6
| 533307 ||  || — || October 8, 2012 || Mount Lemmon || Mount Lemmon Survey ||  || align=right | 2.3 km || 
|-id=308 bgcolor=#d6d6d6
| 533308 ||  || — || September 26, 2011 || Haleakala || Pan-STARRS ||  || align=right | 2.4 km || 
|-id=309 bgcolor=#d6d6d6
| 533309 ||  || — || September 11, 2005 || Kitt Peak || Spacewatch ||  || align=right | 2.5 km || 
|-id=310 bgcolor=#d6d6d6
| 533310 ||  || — || March 8, 2014 || Mount Lemmon || Mount Lemmon Survey ||  || align=right | 2.4 km || 
|-id=311 bgcolor=#d6d6d6
| 533311 ||  || — || March 28, 2009 || Kitt Peak || Spacewatch ||  || align=right | 2.0 km || 
|-id=312 bgcolor=#d6d6d6
| 533312 ||  || — || April 19, 2009 || Kitt Peak || Spacewatch ||  || align=right | 3.0 km || 
|-id=313 bgcolor=#d6d6d6
| 533313 ||  || — || November 17, 2006 || Mount Lemmon || Mount Lemmon Survey ||  || align=right | 2.6 km || 
|-id=314 bgcolor=#d6d6d6
| 533314 ||  || — || January 17, 2008 || Mount Lemmon || Mount Lemmon Survey ||  || align=right | 3.0 km || 
|-id=315 bgcolor=#d6d6d6
| 533315 ||  || — || March 13, 2014 || Mount Lemmon || Mount Lemmon Survey ||  || align=right | 3.5 km || 
|-id=316 bgcolor=#fefefe
| 533316 ||  || — || March 20, 2014 || Mount Lemmon || Mount Lemmon Survey || H || align=right data-sort-value="0.54" | 540 m || 
|-id=317 bgcolor=#FA8072
| 533317 ||  || — || February 21, 2014 || Haleakala || Pan-STARRS || H || align=right data-sort-value="0.56" | 560 m || 
|-id=318 bgcolor=#d6d6d6
| 533318 ||  || — || August 31, 2005 || Kitt Peak || Spacewatch ||  || align=right | 3.2 km || 
|-id=319 bgcolor=#E9E9E9
| 533319 ||  || — || February 28, 2014 || Mount Lemmon || Mount Lemmon Survey ||  || align=right | 2.1 km || 
|-id=320 bgcolor=#d6d6d6
| 533320 ||  || — || September 23, 2011 || Haleakala || Pan-STARRS ||  || align=right | 3.0 km || 
|-id=321 bgcolor=#FA8072
| 533321 ||  || — || November 24, 2000 || Kitt Peak || Spacewatch ||  || align=right data-sort-value="0.47" | 470 m || 
|-id=322 bgcolor=#fefefe
| 533322 ||  || — || March 20, 2014 || Haleakala || Pan-STARRS || H || align=right data-sort-value="0.68" | 680 m || 
|-id=323 bgcolor=#fefefe
| 533323 ||  || — || February 27, 2014 || Mount Lemmon || Mount Lemmon Survey || H || align=right data-sort-value="0.45" | 450 m || 
|-id=324 bgcolor=#d6d6d6
| 533324 ||  || — || February 26, 2008 || Kitt Peak || Spacewatch || THM || align=right | 1.9 km || 
|-id=325 bgcolor=#E9E9E9
| 533325 ||  || — || December 4, 2013 || Haleakala || Pan-STARRS ||  || align=right | 2.0 km || 
|-id=326 bgcolor=#fefefe
| 533326 ||  || — || March 7, 2014 || Mount Lemmon || Mount Lemmon Survey || H || align=right data-sort-value="0.39" | 390 m || 
|-id=327 bgcolor=#d6d6d6
| 533327 ||  || — || January 30, 2008 || Mount Lemmon || Mount Lemmon Survey || VER || align=right | 2.3 km || 
|-id=328 bgcolor=#d6d6d6
| 533328 ||  || — || April 18, 2009 || Mount Lemmon || Mount Lemmon Survey ||  || align=right | 2.3 km || 
|-id=329 bgcolor=#d6d6d6
| 533329 ||  || — || May 2, 2009 || La Sagra || OAM Obs. ||  || align=right | 2.4 km || 
|-id=330 bgcolor=#d6d6d6
| 533330 ||  || — || August 10, 2011 || Haleakala || Pan-STARRS || EUP || align=right | 2.6 km || 
|-id=331 bgcolor=#fefefe
| 533331 ||  || — || March 24, 2014 || Haleakala || Pan-STARRS || H || align=right data-sort-value="0.60" | 600 m || 
|-id=332 bgcolor=#fefefe
| 533332 ||  || — || May 26, 2006 || Mount Lemmon || Mount Lemmon Survey || H || align=right data-sort-value="0.58" | 580 m || 
|-id=333 bgcolor=#fefefe
| 533333 ||  || — || February 4, 2006 || Catalina || CSS || H || align=right data-sort-value="0.55" | 550 m || 
|-id=334 bgcolor=#fefefe
| 533334 ||  || — || February 4, 2006 || Catalina || CSS || H || align=right data-sort-value="0.74" | 740 m || 
|-id=335 bgcolor=#d6d6d6
| 533335 ||  || — || September 23, 2011 || Haleakala || Pan-STARRS ||  || align=right | 3.1 km || 
|-id=336 bgcolor=#fefefe
| 533336 ||  || — || October 8, 2007 || Catalina || CSS || H || align=right data-sort-value="0.68" | 680 m || 
|-id=337 bgcolor=#fefefe
| 533337 ||  || — || March 25, 2014 || Kitt Peak || Spacewatch ||  || align=right data-sort-value="0.57" | 570 m || 
|-id=338 bgcolor=#d6d6d6
| 533338 ||  || — || October 23, 2011 || Haleakala || Pan-STARRS ||  || align=right | 2.9 km || 
|-id=339 bgcolor=#fefefe
| 533339 ||  || — || February 9, 2014 || Mount Lemmon || Mount Lemmon Survey || H || align=right data-sort-value="0.81" | 810 m || 
|-id=340 bgcolor=#d6d6d6
| 533340 ||  || — || December 14, 2013 || Haleakala || Pan-STARRS ||  || align=right | 2.7 km || 
|-id=341 bgcolor=#d6d6d6
| 533341 ||  || — || October 8, 2012 || Haleakala || Pan-STARRS ||  || align=right | 2.2 km || 
|-id=342 bgcolor=#fefefe
| 533342 ||  || — || March 25, 2014 || Kitt Peak || Spacewatch || H || align=right data-sort-value="0.67" | 670 m || 
|-id=343 bgcolor=#fefefe
| 533343 ||  || — || October 8, 2007 || Mount Lemmon || Mount Lemmon Survey || H || align=right data-sort-value="0.49" | 490 m || 
|-id=344 bgcolor=#fefefe
| 533344 ||  || — || March 22, 2014 || Mount Lemmon || Mount Lemmon Survey || H || align=right data-sort-value="0.58" | 580 m || 
|-id=345 bgcolor=#fefefe
| 533345 ||  || — || March 22, 2014 || Mount Lemmon || Mount Lemmon Survey || H || align=right data-sort-value="0.72" | 720 m || 
|-id=346 bgcolor=#d6d6d6
| 533346 ||  || — || January 14, 2008 || Kitt Peak || Spacewatch ||  || align=right | 2.8 km || 
|-id=347 bgcolor=#d6d6d6
| 533347 ||  || — || October 22, 2006 || Mount Lemmon || Mount Lemmon Survey ||  || align=right | 2.2 km || 
|-id=348 bgcolor=#d6d6d6
| 533348 ||  || — || October 4, 2006 || Mount Lemmon || Mount Lemmon Survey ||  || align=right | 2.9 km || 
|-id=349 bgcolor=#d6d6d6
| 533349 ||  || — || September 22, 2011 || Kitt Peak || Spacewatch ||  || align=right | 2.2 km || 
|-id=350 bgcolor=#d6d6d6
| 533350 ||  || — || March 4, 2008 || Kitt Peak || Spacewatch ||  || align=right | 3.1 km || 
|-id=351 bgcolor=#d6d6d6
| 533351 ||  || — || March 24, 2014 || Haleakala || Pan-STARRS ||  || align=right | 2.5 km || 
|-id=352 bgcolor=#d6d6d6
| 533352 ||  || — || October 23, 2011 || Haleakala || Pan-STARRS ||  || align=right | 2.5 km || 
|-id=353 bgcolor=#d6d6d6
| 533353 ||  || — || February 11, 2008 || Mount Lemmon || Mount Lemmon Survey ||  || align=right | 2.3 km || 
|-id=354 bgcolor=#d6d6d6
| 533354 ||  || — || October 20, 2012 || Mount Lemmon || Mount Lemmon Survey ||  || align=right | 3.0 km || 
|-id=355 bgcolor=#d6d6d6
| 533355 ||  || — || April 26, 2003 || Kitt Peak || Spacewatch ||  || align=right | 3.8 km || 
|-id=356 bgcolor=#d6d6d6
| 533356 ||  || — || October 12, 2005 || Kitt Peak || Spacewatch ||  || align=right | 2.7 km || 
|-id=357 bgcolor=#d6d6d6
| 533357 ||  || — || January 16, 2013 || Haleakala || Pan-STARRS ||  || align=right | 2.4 km || 
|-id=358 bgcolor=#d6d6d6
| 533358 ||  || — || March 25, 2014 || Kitt Peak || Spacewatch ||  || align=right | 2.2 km || 
|-id=359 bgcolor=#d6d6d6
| 533359 ||  || — || December 18, 2007 || Mount Lemmon || Mount Lemmon Survey ||  || align=right | 2.3 km || 
|-id=360 bgcolor=#d6d6d6
| 533360 ||  || — || May 15, 2009 || Kitt Peak || Spacewatch ||  || align=right | 2.9 km || 
|-id=361 bgcolor=#d6d6d6
| 533361 ||  || — || September 4, 2011 || Haleakala || Pan-STARRS ||  || align=right | 2.6 km || 
|-id=362 bgcolor=#d6d6d6
| 533362 ||  || — || March 29, 2014 || Mount Lemmon || Mount Lemmon Survey ||  || align=right | 2.5 km || 
|-id=363 bgcolor=#E9E9E9
| 533363 ||  || — || May 13, 2005 || Kitt Peak || Spacewatch ||  || align=right | 1.8 km || 
|-id=364 bgcolor=#d6d6d6
| 533364 ||  || — || June 9, 2010 || WISE || WISE ||  || align=right | 3.0 km || 
|-id=365 bgcolor=#d6d6d6
| 533365 ||  || — || October 31, 2011 || Mount Lemmon || Mount Lemmon Survey ||  || align=right | 2.2 km || 
|-id=366 bgcolor=#d6d6d6
| 533366 ||  || — || November 14, 2006 || Kitt Peak || Spacewatch ||  || align=right | 2.7 km || 
|-id=367 bgcolor=#d6d6d6
| 533367 ||  || — || March 24, 2014 || Haleakala || Pan-STARRS ||  || align=right | 2.7 km || 
|-id=368 bgcolor=#d6d6d6
| 533368 ||  || — || March 24, 2014 || Haleakala || Pan-STARRS ||  || align=right | 2.5 km || 
|-id=369 bgcolor=#E9E9E9
| 533369 ||  || — || November 14, 1998 || Kitt Peak || Spacewatch ||  || align=right | 2.1 km || 
|-id=370 bgcolor=#E9E9E9
| 533370 ||  || — || December 23, 2012 || Haleakala || Pan-STARRS ||  || align=right | 2.2 km || 
|-id=371 bgcolor=#d6d6d6
| 533371 ||  || — || October 19, 2006 || Kitt Peak || Spacewatch || EOS || align=right | 1.5 km || 
|-id=372 bgcolor=#FFC2E0
| 533372 ||  || — || April 4, 2014 || Kitt Peak || Spacewatch || APOPHA || align=right data-sort-value="0.32" | 320 m || 
|-id=373 bgcolor=#d6d6d6
| 533373 ||  || — || May 16, 2009 || Mount Lemmon || Mount Lemmon Survey ||  || align=right | 2.9 km || 
|-id=374 bgcolor=#d6d6d6
| 533374 ||  || — || February 18, 2008 || Mount Lemmon || Mount Lemmon Survey ||  || align=right | 2.6 km || 
|-id=375 bgcolor=#fefefe
| 533375 ||  || — || October 10, 2007 || Mount Lemmon || Mount Lemmon Survey || H || align=right data-sort-value="0.51" | 510 m || 
|-id=376 bgcolor=#d6d6d6
| 533376 ||  || — || February 12, 2008 || Kitt Peak || Spacewatch ||  || align=right | 2.2 km || 
|-id=377 bgcolor=#d6d6d6
| 533377 ||  || — || January 16, 2013 || Mount Lemmon || Mount Lemmon Survey ||  || align=right | 2.4 km || 
|-id=378 bgcolor=#d6d6d6
| 533378 ||  || — || January 12, 2008 || Kitt Peak || Spacewatch ||  || align=right | 2.0 km || 
|-id=379 bgcolor=#fefefe
| 533379 ||  || — || February 28, 2014 || Haleakala || Pan-STARRS || H || align=right data-sort-value="0.52" | 520 m || 
|-id=380 bgcolor=#d6d6d6
| 533380 ||  || — || October 21, 2011 || Kitt Peak || Spacewatch ||  || align=right | 3.1 km || 
|-id=381 bgcolor=#d6d6d6
| 533381 ||  || — || April 5, 2014 || Haleakala || Pan-STARRS ||  || align=right | 2.1 km || 
|-id=382 bgcolor=#fefefe
| 533382 ||  || — || March 24, 2009 || Mount Lemmon || Mount Lemmon Survey || H || align=right data-sort-value="0.63" | 630 m || 
|-id=383 bgcolor=#FA8072
| 533383 ||  || — || October 27, 2005 || Catalina || CSS || H || align=right data-sort-value="0.54" | 540 m || 
|-id=384 bgcolor=#d6d6d6
| 533384 ||  || — || March 2, 2008 || XuYi || PMO NEO || Tj (2.97) || align=right | 3.2 km || 
|-id=385 bgcolor=#fefefe
| 533385 ||  || — || March 25, 2014 || Haleakala || Pan-STARRS || H || align=right data-sort-value="0.51" | 510 m || 
|-id=386 bgcolor=#d6d6d6
| 533386 ||  || — || March 24, 2014 || Haleakala || Pan-STARRS ||  || align=right | 2.8 km || 
|-id=387 bgcolor=#fefefe
| 533387 ||  || — || September 15, 2007 || Mount Lemmon || Mount Lemmon Survey || H || align=right data-sort-value="0.65" | 650 m || 
|-id=388 bgcolor=#FA8072
| 533388 ||  || — || August 7, 2012 || Haleakala || Pan-STARRS || H || align=right data-sort-value="0.56" | 560 m || 
|-id=389 bgcolor=#d6d6d6
| 533389 ||  || — || April 2, 2009 || Mount Lemmon || Mount Lemmon Survey ||  || align=right | 1.9 km || 
|-id=390 bgcolor=#d6d6d6
| 533390 ||  || — || March 22, 2014 || Mount Lemmon || Mount Lemmon Survey ||  || align=right | 2.4 km || 
|-id=391 bgcolor=#fefefe
| 533391 ||  || — || May 19, 2006 || Mount Lemmon || Mount Lemmon Survey || H || align=right data-sort-value="0.63" | 630 m || 
|-id=392 bgcolor=#d6d6d6
| 533392 ||  || — || December 23, 2012 || Haleakala || Pan-STARRS ||  || align=right | 2.4 km || 
|-id=393 bgcolor=#fefefe
| 533393 ||  || — || August 25, 2012 || Haleakala || Pan-STARRS || H || align=right data-sort-value="0.59" | 590 m || 
|-id=394 bgcolor=#fefefe
| 533394 ||  || — || April 10, 2014 || Haleakala || Pan-STARRS || H || align=right data-sort-value="0.51" | 510 m || 
|-id=395 bgcolor=#fefefe
| 533395 ||  || — || February 23, 2014 || Haleakala || Pan-STARRS || H || align=right data-sort-value="0.57" | 570 m || 
|-id=396 bgcolor=#C7FF8F
| 533396 ||  || — || February 2, 2011 || Haleakala || Pan-STARRS || centaurcritical || align=right | 59 km || 
|-id=397 bgcolor=#C2E0FF
| 533397 ||  || — || August 5, 2010 || Haleakala || Pan-STARRS || cubewano (hot)critical || align=right | 236 km || 
|-id=398 bgcolor=#C2E0FF
| 533398 ||  || — || February 14, 2013 || Haleakala || Pan-STARRS || SDOcritical || align=right | 159 km || 
|-id=399 bgcolor=#fefefe
| 533399 ||  || — || October 16, 2012 || Mount Lemmon || Mount Lemmon Survey || H || align=right data-sort-value="0.56" | 560 m || 
|-id=400 bgcolor=#fefefe
| 533400 ||  || — || April 10, 2014 || Haleakala || Pan-STARRS || H || align=right data-sort-value="0.55" | 550 m || 
|}

533401–533500 

|-bgcolor=#d6d6d6
| 533401 ||  || — || November 14, 2006 || Kitt Peak || Spacewatch ||  || align=right | 2.5 km || 
|-id=402 bgcolor=#d6d6d6
| 533402 ||  || — || April 4, 2008 || Catalina || CSS ||  || align=right | 2.8 km || 
|-id=403 bgcolor=#d6d6d6
| 533403 ||  || — || April 5, 2014 || Haleakala || Pan-STARRS ||  || align=right | 2.7 km || 
|-id=404 bgcolor=#d6d6d6
| 533404 ||  || — || March 10, 2008 || Kitt Peak || Spacewatch ||  || align=right | 2.3 km || 
|-id=405 bgcolor=#d6d6d6
| 533405 ||  || — || April 10, 2014 || Haleakala || Pan-STARRS ||  || align=right | 2.7 km || 
|-id=406 bgcolor=#d6d6d6
| 533406 ||  || — || December 23, 2012 || Haleakala || Pan-STARRS ||  || align=right | 2.2 km || 
|-id=407 bgcolor=#d6d6d6
| 533407 ||  || — || April 4, 2014 || Haleakala || Pan-STARRS ||  || align=right | 2.3 km || 
|-id=408 bgcolor=#d6d6d6
| 533408 ||  || — || March 5, 2013 || Kitt Peak || Spacewatch ||  || align=right | 2.9 km || 
|-id=409 bgcolor=#d6d6d6
| 533409 ||  || — || April 5, 2014 || Haleakala || Pan-STARRS ||  || align=right | 2.5 km || 
|-id=410 bgcolor=#d6d6d6
| 533410 ||  || — || December 9, 2006 || Kitt Peak || Spacewatch || 7:4 || align=right | 2.3 km || 
|-id=411 bgcolor=#d6d6d6
| 533411 ||  || — || October 17, 2010 || Mount Lemmon || Mount Lemmon Survey ||  || align=right | 2.8 km || 
|-id=412 bgcolor=#d6d6d6
| 533412 ||  || — || April 1, 2014 || Mount Lemmon || Mount Lemmon Survey ||  || align=right | 3.0 km || 
|-id=413 bgcolor=#d6d6d6
| 533413 ||  || — || April 4, 2014 || Kitt Peak || Spacewatch ||  || align=right | 2.2 km || 
|-id=414 bgcolor=#d6d6d6
| 533414 ||  || — || April 5, 2014 || Haleakala || Pan-STARRS ||  || align=right | 1.9 km || 
|-id=415 bgcolor=#d6d6d6
| 533415 ||  || — || September 4, 2011 || Haleakala || Pan-STARRS ||  || align=right | 3.4 km || 
|-id=416 bgcolor=#d6d6d6
| 533416 ||  || — || March 21, 2004 || Kitt Peak || Spacewatch ||  || align=right | 3.2 km || 
|-id=417 bgcolor=#d6d6d6
| 533417 ||  || — || October 22, 2011 || Mount Lemmon || Mount Lemmon Survey ||  || align=right | 2.3 km || 
|-id=418 bgcolor=#d6d6d6
| 533418 ||  || — || April 3, 2008 || Catalina || CSS || Tj (2.99) || align=right | 3.2 km || 
|-id=419 bgcolor=#d6d6d6
| 533419 ||  || — || October 24, 2011 || Haleakala || Pan-STARRS ||  || align=right | 2.4 km || 
|-id=420 bgcolor=#d6d6d6
| 533420 ||  || — || October 1, 2010 || Mount Lemmon || Mount Lemmon Survey ||  || align=right | 2.4 km || 
|-id=421 bgcolor=#d6d6d6
| 533421 ||  || — || April 5, 2014 || Haleakala || Pan-STARRS ||  || align=right | 2.6 km || 
|-id=422 bgcolor=#d6d6d6
| 533422 ||  || — || April 5, 2014 || Haleakala || Pan-STARRS ||  || align=right | 2.3 km || 
|-id=423 bgcolor=#d6d6d6
| 533423 ||  || — || January 17, 2013 || Haleakala || Pan-STARRS ||  || align=right | 2.2 km || 
|-id=424 bgcolor=#d6d6d6
| 533424 ||  || — || April 30, 2003 || Kitt Peak || Spacewatch ||  || align=right | 2.7 km || 
|-id=425 bgcolor=#d6d6d6
| 533425 ||  || — || February 9, 2008 || Kitt Peak || Spacewatch ||  || align=right | 2.2 km || 
|-id=426 bgcolor=#d6d6d6
| 533426 ||  || — || March 11, 2008 || Kitt Peak || Spacewatch ||  || align=right | 2.4 km || 
|-id=427 bgcolor=#d6d6d6
| 533427 ||  || — || April 21, 2009 || Mount Lemmon || Mount Lemmon Survey ||  || align=right | 1.7 km || 
|-id=428 bgcolor=#d6d6d6
| 533428 ||  || — || October 20, 2011 || Mount Lemmon || Mount Lemmon Survey ||  || align=right | 2.0 km || 
|-id=429 bgcolor=#d6d6d6
| 533429 ||  || — || October 24, 2011 || Haleakala || Pan-STARRS ||  || align=right | 2.0 km || 
|-id=430 bgcolor=#d6d6d6
| 533430 ||  || — || December 16, 2007 || Kitt Peak || Spacewatch ||  || align=right | 1.7 km || 
|-id=431 bgcolor=#d6d6d6
| 533431 ||  || — || January 11, 2008 || Kitt Peak || Spacewatch ||  || align=right | 2.0 km || 
|-id=432 bgcolor=#d6d6d6
| 533432 ||  || — || April 5, 2014 || Haleakala || Pan-STARRS ||  || align=right | 2.5 km || 
|-id=433 bgcolor=#d6d6d6
| 533433 ||  || — || January 19, 2013 || Mount Lemmon || Mount Lemmon Survey ||  || align=right | 2.0 km || 
|-id=434 bgcolor=#d6d6d6
| 533434 ||  || — || June 7, 2010 || WISE || WISE ||  || align=right | 2.9 km || 
|-id=435 bgcolor=#d6d6d6
| 533435 ||  || — || January 18, 2013 || Haleakala || Pan-STARRS ||  || align=right | 2.7 km || 
|-id=436 bgcolor=#fefefe
| 533436 ||  || — || April 5, 2014 || Haleakala || Pan-STARRS ||  || align=right data-sort-value="0.45" | 450 m || 
|-id=437 bgcolor=#d6d6d6
| 533437 ||  || — || October 13, 2006 || Kitt Peak || Spacewatch ||  || align=right | 2.4 km || 
|-id=438 bgcolor=#d6d6d6
| 533438 ||  || — || September 19, 1995 || Kitt Peak || Spacewatch ||  || align=right | 2.8 km || 
|-id=439 bgcolor=#d6d6d6
| 533439 ||  || — || July 14, 2010 || WISE || WISE ||  || align=right | 2.6 km || 
|-id=440 bgcolor=#FA8072
| 533440 ||  || — || March 27, 2009 || Mount Lemmon || Mount Lemmon Survey || H || align=right data-sort-value="0.63" | 630 m || 
|-id=441 bgcolor=#fefefe
| 533441 ||  || — || February 10, 2014 || Haleakala || Pan-STARRS || H || align=right data-sort-value="0.57" | 570 m || 
|-id=442 bgcolor=#d6d6d6
| 533442 ||  || — || February 12, 2008 || Mount Lemmon || Mount Lemmon Survey ||  || align=right | 2.3 km || 
|-id=443 bgcolor=#fefefe
| 533443 ||  || — || April 11, 2003 || Kitt Peak || Spacewatch || H || align=right data-sort-value="0.37" | 370 m || 
|-id=444 bgcolor=#d6d6d6
| 533444 ||  || — || March 21, 2014 || Kitt Peak || Spacewatch ||  || align=right | 2.5 km || 
|-id=445 bgcolor=#d6d6d6
| 533445 ||  || — || October 24, 2011 || Haleakala || Pan-STARRS ||  || align=right | 2.7 km || 
|-id=446 bgcolor=#d6d6d6
| 533446 ||  || — || March 26, 2008 || Mount Lemmon || Mount Lemmon Survey ||  || align=right | 2.3 km || 
|-id=447 bgcolor=#d6d6d6
| 533447 ||  || — || February 2, 2008 || Kitt Peak || Spacewatch ||  || align=right | 2.2 km || 
|-id=448 bgcolor=#d6d6d6
| 533448 ||  || — || November 13, 2006 || Catalina || CSS ||  || align=right | 3.3 km || 
|-id=449 bgcolor=#d6d6d6
| 533449 ||  || — || May 11, 2010 || WISE || WISE ||  || align=right | 3.3 km || 
|-id=450 bgcolor=#d6d6d6
| 533450 ||  || — || May 14, 2010 || WISE || WISE ||  || align=right | 2.1 km || 
|-id=451 bgcolor=#d6d6d6
| 533451 ||  || — || October 24, 2011 || Haleakala || Pan-STARRS ||  || align=right | 2.2 km || 
|-id=452 bgcolor=#d6d6d6
| 533452 ||  || — || March 23, 2014 || Kitt Peak || Spacewatch ||  || align=right | 2.6 km || 
|-id=453 bgcolor=#d6d6d6
| 533453 ||  || — || January 14, 2008 || Kitt Peak || Spacewatch ||  || align=right | 2.2 km || 
|-id=454 bgcolor=#d6d6d6
| 533454 ||  || — || January 16, 2013 || Haleakala || Pan-STARRS ||  || align=right | 2.5 km || 
|-id=455 bgcolor=#d6d6d6
| 533455 ||  || — || February 28, 2014 || Haleakala || Pan-STARRS ||  || align=right | 3.0 km || 
|-id=456 bgcolor=#d6d6d6
| 533456 ||  || — || April 8, 2014 || Haleakala || Pan-STARRS ||  || align=right | 2.7 km || 
|-id=457 bgcolor=#d6d6d6
| 533457 ||  || — || March 15, 2008 || Mount Lemmon || Mount Lemmon Survey ||  || align=right | 2.6 km || 
|-id=458 bgcolor=#d6d6d6
| 533458 ||  || — || April 4, 2014 || Haleakala || Pan-STARRS ||  || align=right | 2.3 km || 
|-id=459 bgcolor=#d6d6d6
| 533459 ||  || — || October 1, 2010 || Mount Lemmon || Mount Lemmon Survey ||  || align=right | 2.0 km || 
|-id=460 bgcolor=#E9E9E9
| 533460 ||  || — || March 25, 2014 || Kitt Peak || Spacewatch ||  || align=right | 1.0 km || 
|-id=461 bgcolor=#d6d6d6
| 533461 ||  || — || December 1, 2005 || Mount Lemmon || Mount Lemmon Survey ||  || align=right | 2.5 km || 
|-id=462 bgcolor=#d6d6d6
| 533462 ||  || — || January 16, 2013 || Mount Lemmon || Mount Lemmon Survey || EOS || align=right | 1.7 km || 
|-id=463 bgcolor=#d6d6d6
| 533463 ||  || — || October 1, 2005 || Kitt Peak || Spacewatch ||  || align=right | 2.3 km || 
|-id=464 bgcolor=#d6d6d6
| 533464 ||  || — || March 11, 2008 || Mount Lemmon || Mount Lemmon Survey ||  || align=right | 2.1 km || 
|-id=465 bgcolor=#d6d6d6
| 533465 ||  || — || November 18, 2007 || Kitt Peak || Spacewatch ||  || align=right | 1.7 km || 
|-id=466 bgcolor=#d6d6d6
| 533466 ||  || — || December 30, 2007 || Kitt Peak || Spacewatch ||  || align=right | 2.2 km || 
|-id=467 bgcolor=#fefefe
| 533467 ||  || — || October 9, 2012 || Catalina || CSS || H || align=right data-sort-value="0.81" | 810 m || 
|-id=468 bgcolor=#d6d6d6
| 533468 ||  || — || March 25, 2014 || Kitt Peak || Spacewatch ||  || align=right | 2.9 km || 
|-id=469 bgcolor=#d6d6d6
| 533469 ||  || — || May 20, 2010 || WISE || WISE ||  || align=right | 2.5 km || 
|-id=470 bgcolor=#d6d6d6
| 533470 ||  || — || October 23, 2011 || Mount Lemmon || Mount Lemmon Survey ||  || align=right | 2.2 km || 
|-id=471 bgcolor=#d6d6d6
| 533471 ||  || — || October 1, 2005 || Mount Lemmon || Mount Lemmon Survey || VER || align=right | 2.2 km || 
|-id=472 bgcolor=#d6d6d6
| 533472 ||  || — || December 18, 2007 || Mount Lemmon || Mount Lemmon Survey ||  || align=right | 2.2 km || 
|-id=473 bgcolor=#d6d6d6
| 533473 ||  || — || March 25, 2014 || Kitt Peak || Spacewatch ||  || align=right | 2.7 km || 
|-id=474 bgcolor=#d6d6d6
| 533474 ||  || — || November 2, 2011 || Kitt Peak || Spacewatch ||  || align=right | 2.4 km || 
|-id=475 bgcolor=#d6d6d6
| 533475 ||  || — || December 18, 2001 || Socorro || LINEAR ||  || align=right | 2.7 km || 
|-id=476 bgcolor=#d6d6d6
| 533476 ||  || — || February 24, 2008 || Mount Lemmon || Mount Lemmon Survey || THM || align=right | 1.6 km || 
|-id=477 bgcolor=#fefefe
| 533477 ||  || — || April 25, 2014 || Mount Lemmon || Mount Lemmon Survey || H || align=right data-sort-value="0.62" | 620 m || 
|-id=478 bgcolor=#fefefe
| 533478 ||  || — || November 15, 2007 || Catalina || CSS || H || align=right data-sort-value="0.64" | 640 m || 
|-id=479 bgcolor=#d6d6d6
| 533479 ||  || — || January 5, 2013 || Mount Lemmon || Mount Lemmon Survey ||  || align=right | 1.7 km || 
|-id=480 bgcolor=#d6d6d6
| 533480 ||  || — || March 25, 2014 || Kitt Peak || Spacewatch ||  || align=right | 2.6 km || 
|-id=481 bgcolor=#fefefe
| 533481 ||  || — || June 5, 2011 || Mount Lemmon || Mount Lemmon Survey ||  || align=right data-sort-value="0.61" | 610 m || 
|-id=482 bgcolor=#d6d6d6
| 533482 ||  || — || February 9, 2008 || Mount Lemmon || Mount Lemmon Survey ||  || align=right | 2.1 km || 
|-id=483 bgcolor=#d6d6d6
| 533483 ||  || — || March 23, 2014 || Kitt Peak || Spacewatch ||  || align=right | 2.8 km || 
|-id=484 bgcolor=#d6d6d6
| 533484 ||  || — || March 11, 2008 || Mount Lemmon || Mount Lemmon Survey ||  || align=right | 2.6 km || 
|-id=485 bgcolor=#d6d6d6
| 533485 ||  || — || September 14, 2010 || Mount Lemmon || Mount Lemmon Survey ||  || align=right | 2.4 km || 
|-id=486 bgcolor=#d6d6d6
| 533486 ||  || — || June 12, 2010 || WISE || WISE ||  || align=right | 2.7 km || 
|-id=487 bgcolor=#d6d6d6
| 533487 ||  || — || March 1, 2008 || Kitt Peak || Spacewatch ||  || align=right | 2.4 km || 
|-id=488 bgcolor=#d6d6d6
| 533488 ||  || — || September 4, 2011 || Haleakala || Pan-STARRS ||  || align=right | 2.6 km || 
|-id=489 bgcolor=#d6d6d6
| 533489 ||  || — || March 25, 2014 || Mount Lemmon || Mount Lemmon Survey ||  || align=right | 3.0 km || 
|-id=490 bgcolor=#d6d6d6
| 533490 ||  || — || April 25, 2014 || Mount Lemmon || Mount Lemmon Survey ||  || align=right | 2.7 km || 
|-id=491 bgcolor=#d6d6d6
| 533491 ||  || — || October 29, 2005 || Mount Lemmon || Mount Lemmon Survey ||  || align=right | 3.0 km || 
|-id=492 bgcolor=#d6d6d6
| 533492 ||  || — || September 16, 2010 || Kitt Peak || Spacewatch ||  || align=right | 2.2 km || 
|-id=493 bgcolor=#d6d6d6
| 533493 ||  || — || April 29, 2014 || Haleakala || Pan-STARRS ||  || align=right | 2.0 km || 
|-id=494 bgcolor=#fefefe
| 533494 ||  || — || October 31, 2005 || Kitt Peak || Spacewatch ||  || align=right data-sort-value="0.46" | 460 m || 
|-id=495 bgcolor=#FA8072
| 533495 ||  || — || September 7, 2008 || Catalina || CSS ||  || align=right data-sort-value="0.66" | 660 m || 
|-id=496 bgcolor=#fefefe
| 533496 ||  || — || February 28, 2014 || Haleakala || Pan-STARRS || H || align=right data-sort-value="0.71" | 710 m || 
|-id=497 bgcolor=#fefefe
| 533497 ||  || — || April 2, 2006 || Catalina || CSS || H || align=right data-sort-value="0.68" | 680 m || 
|-id=498 bgcolor=#d6d6d6
| 533498 ||  || — || February 13, 2013 || Haleakala || Pan-STARRS ||  || align=right | 2.4 km || 
|-id=499 bgcolor=#d6d6d6
| 533499 ||  || — || December 22, 2012 || Haleakala || Pan-STARRS ||  || align=right | 2.5 km || 
|-id=500 bgcolor=#d6d6d6
| 533500 ||  || — || March 6, 2008 || Mount Lemmon || Mount Lemmon Survey ||  || align=right | 2.9 km || 
|}

533501–533600 

|-bgcolor=#fefefe
| 533501 ||  || — || April 9, 2003 || Socorro || LINEAR || H || align=right data-sort-value="0.56" | 560 m || 
|-id=502 bgcolor=#fefefe
| 533502 ||  || — || June 12, 2009 || Kitt Peak || Spacewatch || H || align=right data-sort-value="0.58" | 580 m || 
|-id=503 bgcolor=#d6d6d6
| 533503 ||  || — || July 23, 2010 || WISE || WISE ||  || align=right | 2.0 km || 
|-id=504 bgcolor=#fefefe
| 533504 ||  || — || October 30, 2008 || Kitt Peak || Spacewatch || (2076) || align=right data-sort-value="0.62" | 620 m || 
|-id=505 bgcolor=#fefefe
| 533505 ||  || — || May 1, 2009 || Mount Lemmon || Mount Lemmon Survey || H || align=right data-sort-value="0.54" | 540 m || 
|-id=506 bgcolor=#C2E0FF
| 533506 ||  || — || March 13, 2011 || Haleakala || Pan-STARRS || cubewano (hot)critical || align=right | 224 km || 
|-id=507 bgcolor=#C2E0FF
| 533507 ||  || — || April 15, 2012 || Haleakala || Pan-STARRS || other TNO || align=right | 226 km || 
|-id=508 bgcolor=#C2E0FF
| 533508 ||  || — || January 11, 2011 || Haleakala || Pan-STARRS || SDOcritical || align=right | 231 km || 
|-id=509 bgcolor=#fefefe
| 533509 ||  || — || November 21, 2007 || Mount Lemmon || Mount Lemmon Survey || H || align=right data-sort-value="0.66" | 660 m || 
|-id=510 bgcolor=#fefefe
| 533510 ||  || — || April 8, 2014 || Haleakala || Pan-STARRS || H || align=right data-sort-value="0.71" | 710 m || 
|-id=511 bgcolor=#d6d6d6
| 533511 ||  || — || April 30, 2014 || Haleakala || Pan-STARRS ||  || align=right | 3.1 km || 
|-id=512 bgcolor=#d6d6d6
| 533512 ||  || — || February 9, 2008 || Mount Lemmon || Mount Lemmon Survey ||  || align=right | 2.0 km || 
|-id=513 bgcolor=#d6d6d6
| 533513 ||  || — || December 21, 2006 || Mount Lemmon || Mount Lemmon Survey ||  || align=right | 2.5 km || 
|-id=514 bgcolor=#d6d6d6
| 533514 ||  || — || January 5, 2013 || Kitt Peak || Spacewatch ||  || align=right | 2.4 km || 
|-id=515 bgcolor=#d6d6d6
| 533515 ||  || — || July 14, 2010 || WISE || WISE ||  || align=right | 2.9 km || 
|-id=516 bgcolor=#d6d6d6
| 533516 ||  || — || January 13, 2002 || Kitt Peak || Spacewatch ||  || align=right | 2.4 km || 
|-id=517 bgcolor=#d6d6d6
| 533517 ||  || — || January 6, 2013 || Kitt Peak || Spacewatch || Tj (2.99) || align=right | 2.4 km || 
|-id=518 bgcolor=#d6d6d6
| 533518 ||  || — || April 24, 2014 || Haleakala || Pan-STARRS ||  || align=right | 2.0 km || 
|-id=519 bgcolor=#d6d6d6
| 533519 ||  || — || March 8, 2008 || Kitt Peak || Spacewatch ||  || align=right | 2.4 km || 
|-id=520 bgcolor=#d6d6d6
| 533520 ||  || — || October 18, 2011 || Kitt Peak || Spacewatch ||  || align=right | 2.5 km || 
|-id=521 bgcolor=#d6d6d6
| 533521 ||  || — || December 24, 2006 || Kitt Peak || Spacewatch ||  || align=right | 2.9 km || 
|-id=522 bgcolor=#d6d6d6
| 533522 ||  || — || July 6, 2010 || WISE || WISE ||  || align=right | 2.3 km || 
|-id=523 bgcolor=#d6d6d6
| 533523 ||  || — || December 23, 2012 || Haleakala || Pan-STARRS || 7:4 || align=right | 2.9 km || 
|-id=524 bgcolor=#d6d6d6
| 533524 ||  || — || October 20, 2011 || Mount Lemmon || Mount Lemmon Survey ||  || align=right | 2.5 km || 
|-id=525 bgcolor=#d6d6d6
| 533525 ||  || — || May 3, 2014 || Mount Lemmon || Mount Lemmon Survey ||  || align=right | 2.1 km || 
|-id=526 bgcolor=#d6d6d6
| 533526 ||  || — || December 12, 2006 || Kitt Peak || Spacewatch ||  || align=right | 2.7 km || 
|-id=527 bgcolor=#d6d6d6
| 533527 ||  || — || October 23, 2011 || Mount Lemmon || Mount Lemmon Survey ||  || align=right | 2.1 km || 
|-id=528 bgcolor=#fefefe
| 533528 ||  || — || September 30, 2009 || Mount Lemmon || Mount Lemmon Survey || H || align=right data-sort-value="0.73" | 730 m || 
|-id=529 bgcolor=#fefefe
| 533529 ||  || — || April 10, 2014 || Haleakala || Pan-STARRS || H || align=right data-sort-value="0.87" | 870 m || 
|-id=530 bgcolor=#d6d6d6
| 533530 ||  || — || April 8, 2014 || Haleakala || Pan-STARRS ||  || align=right | 2.8 km || 
|-id=531 bgcolor=#d6d6d6
| 533531 ||  || — || April 30, 2014 || Haleakala || Pan-STARRS ||  || align=right | 3.2 km || 
|-id=532 bgcolor=#d6d6d6
| 533532 ||  || — || March 10, 2008 || Mount Lemmon || Mount Lemmon Survey || Tj (2.96) || align=right | 3.0 km || 
|-id=533 bgcolor=#d6d6d6
| 533533 ||  || — || April 3, 2008 || Mount Lemmon || Mount Lemmon Survey ||  || align=right | 2.4 km || 
|-id=534 bgcolor=#fefefe
| 533534 ||  || — || May 4, 2014 || Haleakala || Pan-STARRS ||  || align=right data-sort-value="0.71" | 710 m || 
|-id=535 bgcolor=#fefefe
| 533535 ||  || — || September 24, 2011 || Haleakala || Pan-STARRS ||  || align=right data-sort-value="0.65" | 650 m || 
|-id=536 bgcolor=#d6d6d6
| 533536 ||  || — || May 4, 2014 || Kitt Peak || Spacewatch ||  || align=right | 2.1 km || 
|-id=537 bgcolor=#d6d6d6
| 533537 ||  || — || March 27, 2008 || Mount Lemmon || Mount Lemmon Survey ||  || align=right | 2.0 km || 
|-id=538 bgcolor=#d6d6d6
| 533538 ||  || — || October 27, 2005 || Kitt Peak || Spacewatch ||  || align=right | 2.9 km || 
|-id=539 bgcolor=#d6d6d6
| 533539 ||  || — || April 30, 2014 || Haleakala || Pan-STARRS ||  || align=right | 2.4 km || 
|-id=540 bgcolor=#d6d6d6
| 533540 ||  || — || April 30, 2014 || Haleakala || Pan-STARRS ||  || align=right | 2.1 km || 
|-id=541 bgcolor=#FFC2E0
| 533541 ||  || — || May 7, 2014 || Mount Lemmon || Mount Lemmon Survey || AMOcritical || align=right data-sort-value="0.37" | 370 m || 
|-id=542 bgcolor=#fefefe
| 533542 ||  || — || April 17, 2009 || Kitt Peak || Spacewatch || H || align=right data-sort-value="0.47" | 470 m || 
|-id=543 bgcolor=#fefefe
| 533543 ||  || — || February 5, 2011 || Mount Lemmon || Mount Lemmon Survey || H || align=right data-sort-value="0.73" | 730 m || 
|-id=544 bgcolor=#FA8072
| 533544 ||  || — || May 9, 2014 || Haleakala || Pan-STARRS ||  || align=right data-sort-value="0.79" | 790 m || 
|-id=545 bgcolor=#d6d6d6
| 533545 ||  || — || April 25, 2003 || Kitt Peak || Spacewatch ||  || align=right | 2.8 km || 
|-id=546 bgcolor=#d6d6d6
| 533546 ||  || — || January 16, 2008 || Kitt Peak || Spacewatch ||  || align=right | 2.0 km || 
|-id=547 bgcolor=#d6d6d6
| 533547 ||  || — || May 28, 2009 || Mount Lemmon || Mount Lemmon Survey ||  || align=right | 2.0 km || 
|-id=548 bgcolor=#d6d6d6
| 533548 ||  || — || September 2, 2010 || Mount Lemmon || Mount Lemmon Survey ||  || align=right | 2.2 km || 
|-id=549 bgcolor=#d6d6d6
| 533549 ||  || — || July 17, 2010 || WISE || WISE ||  || align=right | 4.4 km || 
|-id=550 bgcolor=#d6d6d6
| 533550 ||  || — || March 31, 2008 || Mount Lemmon || Mount Lemmon Survey ||  || align=right | 2.4 km || 
|-id=551 bgcolor=#d6d6d6
| 533551 ||  || — || May 4, 2014 || Haleakala || Pan-STARRS || Tj (2.97) || align=right | 2.8 km || 
|-id=552 bgcolor=#d6d6d6
| 533552 ||  || — || April 6, 2014 || Mount Lemmon || Mount Lemmon Survey ||  || align=right | 2.3 km || 
|-id=553 bgcolor=#d6d6d6
| 533553 ||  || — || October 21, 2011 || Mount Lemmon || Mount Lemmon Survey ||  || align=right | 3.3 km || 
|-id=554 bgcolor=#fefefe
| 533554 ||  || — || April 30, 2014 || Haleakala || Pan-STARRS ||  || align=right data-sort-value="0.52" | 520 m || 
|-id=555 bgcolor=#d6d6d6
| 533555 ||  || — || March 1, 2008 || Kitt Peak || Spacewatch ||  || align=right | 2.3 km || 
|-id=556 bgcolor=#d6d6d6
| 533556 ||  || — || April 30, 2014 || Haleakala || Pan-STARRS ||  || align=right | 2.9 km || 
|-id=557 bgcolor=#fefefe
| 533557 ||  || — || April 10, 2014 || Haleakala || Pan-STARRS || H || align=right data-sort-value="0.68" | 680 m || 
|-id=558 bgcolor=#fefefe
| 533558 ||  || — || November 9, 2007 || Catalina || CSS || H || align=right data-sort-value="0.74" | 740 m || 
|-id=559 bgcolor=#C7FF8F
| 533559 ||  || — || April 28, 2011 || Haleakala || Pan-STARRS || centaurcritical || align=right | 116 km || 
|-id=560 bgcolor=#C2E0FF
| 533560 ||  || — || May 9, 2010 || Haleakala || Pan-STARRS || SDO || align=right | 321 km || 
|-id=561 bgcolor=#C2E0FF
| 533561 ||  || — || May 9, 2010 || Haleakala || Pan-STARRS || other TNO || align=right | 212 km || 
|-id=562 bgcolor=#C2E0FF
| 533562 ||  || — || May 6, 2010 || Haleakala || Pan-STARRS || plutinocritical || align=right | 149 km || 
|-id=563 bgcolor=#C2E0FF
| 533563 ||  || — || April 20, 2010 || Haleakala || Pan-STARRS || SDO || align=right | 307 km || 
|-id=564 bgcolor=#fefefe
| 533564 ||  || — || October 14, 2007 || Mount Lemmon || Mount Lemmon Survey || H || align=right data-sort-value="0.48" | 480 m || 
|-id=565 bgcolor=#fefefe
| 533565 ||  || — || April 11, 2003 || Kitt Peak || Spacewatch || H || align=right data-sort-value="0.64" | 640 m || 
|-id=566 bgcolor=#d6d6d6
| 533566 ||  || — || April 25, 2003 || Campo Imperatore || CINEOS ||  || align=right | 2.1 km || 
|-id=567 bgcolor=#d6d6d6
| 533567 ||  || — || September 29, 2005 || Mount Lemmon || Mount Lemmon Survey ||  || align=right | 2.6 km || 
|-id=568 bgcolor=#d6d6d6
| 533568 ||  || — || February 8, 2008 || Kitt Peak || Spacewatch ||  || align=right | 2.1 km || 
|-id=569 bgcolor=#d6d6d6
| 533569 ||  || — || May 3, 2008 || Mount Lemmon || Mount Lemmon Survey ||  || align=right | 5.7 km || 
|-id=570 bgcolor=#fefefe
| 533570 ||  || — || October 20, 1998 || Kitt Peak || Spacewatch ||  || align=right data-sort-value="0.77" | 770 m || 
|-id=571 bgcolor=#d6d6d6
| 533571 ||  || — || March 28, 2008 || Kitt Peak || Spacewatch ||  || align=right | 2.5 km || 
|-id=572 bgcolor=#d6d6d6
| 533572 ||  || — || May 6, 2014 || Haleakala || Pan-STARRS ||  || align=right | 2.2 km || 
|-id=573 bgcolor=#d6d6d6
| 533573 ||  || — || May 5, 2003 || Kitt Peak || Spacewatch ||  || align=right | 3.2 km || 
|-id=574 bgcolor=#d6d6d6
| 533574 ||  || — || April 8, 2003 || Kitt Peak || Spacewatch ||  || align=right | 2.8 km || 
|-id=575 bgcolor=#d6d6d6
| 533575 ||  || — || May 6, 2014 || Haleakala || Pan-STARRS ||  || align=right | 2.4 km || 
|-id=576 bgcolor=#d6d6d6
| 533576 ||  || — || May 6, 2014 || Haleakala || Pan-STARRS ||  || align=right | 2.1 km || 
|-id=577 bgcolor=#d6d6d6
| 533577 ||  || — || February 15, 2013 || Haleakala || Pan-STARRS ||  || align=right | 2.1 km || 
|-id=578 bgcolor=#d6d6d6
| 533578 ||  || — || May 10, 2014 || Kitt Peak || Spacewatch ||  || align=right | 2.3 km || 
|-id=579 bgcolor=#d6d6d6
| 533579 ||  || — || September 11, 2004 || Kitt Peak || Spacewatch ||  || align=right | 2.2 km || 
|-id=580 bgcolor=#d6d6d6
| 533580 ||  || — || January 17, 2013 || Haleakala || Pan-STARRS ||  || align=right | 1.7 km || 
|-id=581 bgcolor=#d6d6d6
| 533581 ||  || — || October 22, 2011 || Kitt Peak || Spacewatch ||  || align=right | 2.7 km || 
|-id=582 bgcolor=#d6d6d6
| 533582 ||  || — || May 6, 2014 || Haleakala || Pan-STARRS ||  || align=right | 2.4 km || 
|-id=583 bgcolor=#d6d6d6
| 533583 ||  || — || March 24, 2013 || Mount Lemmon || Mount Lemmon Survey ||  || align=right | 2.6 km || 
|-id=584 bgcolor=#d6d6d6
| 533584 ||  || — || June 1, 2003 || Kitt Peak || Spacewatch ||  || align=right | 2.4 km || 
|-id=585 bgcolor=#d6d6d6
| 533585 ||  || — || May 27, 2009 || Mount Lemmon || Mount Lemmon Survey ||  || align=right | 2.9 km || 
|-id=586 bgcolor=#fefefe
| 533586 ||  || — || October 24, 2012 || Haleakala || Pan-STARRS || H || align=right data-sort-value="0.58" | 580 m || 
|-id=587 bgcolor=#d6d6d6
| 533587 ||  || — || March 29, 2014 || Haleakala || Pan-STARRS ||  || align=right | 2.7 km || 
|-id=588 bgcolor=#fefefe
| 533588 ||  || — || October 6, 2012 || Haleakala || Pan-STARRS || H || align=right data-sort-value="0.54" | 540 m || 
|-id=589 bgcolor=#fefefe
| 533589 ||  || — || October 20, 2008 || Mount Lemmon || Mount Lemmon Survey ||  || align=right data-sort-value="0.47" | 470 m || 
|-id=590 bgcolor=#fefefe
| 533590 ||  || — || May 20, 2014 || Haleakala || Pan-STARRS ||  || align=right data-sort-value="0.50" | 500 m || 
|-id=591 bgcolor=#d6d6d6
| 533591 ||  || — || January 4, 2013 || Kitt Peak || Spacewatch ||  || align=right | 2.8 km || 
|-id=592 bgcolor=#fefefe
| 533592 ||  || — || September 13, 2007 || Catalina || CSS || H || align=right data-sort-value="0.56" | 560 m || 
|-id=593 bgcolor=#fefefe
| 533593 ||  || — || December 29, 2008 || Kitt Peak || Spacewatch ||  || align=right data-sort-value="0.59" | 590 m || 
|-id=594 bgcolor=#fefefe
| 533594 ||  || — || January 18, 2013 || Mount Lemmon || Mount Lemmon Survey ||  || align=right data-sort-value="0.61" | 610 m || 
|-id=595 bgcolor=#fefefe
| 533595 ||  || — || April 10, 2014 || Haleakala || Pan-STARRS || H || align=right data-sort-value="0.65" | 650 m || 
|-id=596 bgcolor=#fefefe
| 533596 ||  || — || April 8, 2014 || Haleakala || Pan-STARRS || H || align=right data-sort-value="0.61" | 610 m || 
|-id=597 bgcolor=#fefefe
| 533597 ||  || — || April 10, 2014 || Haleakala || Pan-STARRS || H || align=right data-sort-value="0.67" | 670 m || 
|-id=598 bgcolor=#d6d6d6
| 533598 ||  || — || April 9, 2014 || Haleakala || Pan-STARRS ||  || align=right | 2.9 km || 
|-id=599 bgcolor=#d6d6d6
| 533599 ||  || — || December 22, 2012 || Haleakala || Pan-STARRS ||  || align=right | 3.2 km || 
|-id=600 bgcolor=#d6d6d6
| 533600 ||  || — || October 2, 2006 || Mount Lemmon || Mount Lemmon Survey ||  || align=right | 3.2 km || 
|}

533601–533700 

|-bgcolor=#fefefe
| 533601 ||  || — || December 25, 2005 || Mount Lemmon || Mount Lemmon Survey ||  || align=right data-sort-value="0.78" | 780 m || 
|-id=602 bgcolor=#d6d6d6
| 533602 ||  || — || April 30, 2014 || Haleakala || Pan-STARRS ||  || align=right | 2.4 km || 
|-id=603 bgcolor=#d6d6d6
| 533603 ||  || — || February 9, 2008 || Kitt Peak || Spacewatch ||  || align=right | 1.9 km || 
|-id=604 bgcolor=#d6d6d6
| 533604 ||  || — || April 26, 2008 || Mount Lemmon || Mount Lemmon Survey ||  || align=right | 2.7 km || 
|-id=605 bgcolor=#d6d6d6
| 533605 ||  || — || February 14, 2013 || Haleakala || Pan-STARRS ||  || align=right | 2.6 km || 
|-id=606 bgcolor=#fefefe
| 533606 ||  || — || October 1, 2008 || Mount Lemmon || Mount Lemmon Survey ||  || align=right data-sort-value="0.52" | 520 m || 
|-id=607 bgcolor=#d6d6d6
| 533607 ||  || — || April 8, 2014 || Mount Lemmon || Mount Lemmon Survey ||  || align=right | 2.6 km || 
|-id=608 bgcolor=#d6d6d6
| 533608 ||  || — || May 24, 2014 || Mount Lemmon || Mount Lemmon Survey ||  || align=right | 3.0 km || 
|-id=609 bgcolor=#FA8072
| 533609 ||  || — || October 28, 2011 || Mount Lemmon || Mount Lemmon Survey ||  || align=right data-sort-value="0.70" | 700 m || 
|-id=610 bgcolor=#fefefe
| 533610 ||  || — || September 21, 2008 || Catalina || CSS ||  || align=right data-sort-value="0.72" | 720 m || 
|-id=611 bgcolor=#FA8072
| 533611 ||  || — || April 28, 2014 || Haleakala || Pan-STARRS || H || align=right data-sort-value="0.62" | 620 m || 
|-id=612 bgcolor=#d6d6d6
| 533612 ||  || — || February 3, 2013 || Haleakala || Pan-STARRS ||  || align=right | 2.7 km || 
|-id=613 bgcolor=#d6d6d6
| 533613 ||  || — || January 10, 2013 || Kitt Peak || Spacewatch ||  || align=right | 3.7 km || 
|-id=614 bgcolor=#fefefe
| 533614 ||  || — || September 4, 2008 || Kitt Peak || Spacewatch ||  || align=right data-sort-value="0.59" | 590 m || 
|-id=615 bgcolor=#fefefe
| 533615 ||  || — || April 30, 2014 || Haleakala || Pan-STARRS || H || align=right data-sort-value="0.62" | 620 m || 
|-id=616 bgcolor=#fefefe
| 533616 ||  || — || April 8, 2014 || Haleakala || Pan-STARRS || H || align=right data-sort-value="0.60" | 600 m || 
|-id=617 bgcolor=#fefefe
| 533617 ||  || — || November 7, 2008 || Mount Lemmon || Mount Lemmon Survey ||  || align=right data-sort-value="0.66" | 660 m || 
|-id=618 bgcolor=#d6d6d6
| 533618 ||  || — || February 11, 2013 || Catalina || CSS || EUP || align=right | 3.3 km || 
|-id=619 bgcolor=#d6d6d6
| 533619 ||  || — || May 19, 2006 || Mount Lemmon || Mount Lemmon Survey || SHU3:2 || align=right | 5.4 km || 
|-id=620 bgcolor=#d6d6d6
| 533620 ||  || — || May 9, 2014 || Haleakala || Pan-STARRS ||  || align=right | 2.3 km || 
|-id=621 bgcolor=#d6d6d6
| 533621 ||  || — || July 8, 2010 || WISE || WISE ||  || align=right | 2.9 km || 
|-id=622 bgcolor=#d6d6d6
| 533622 ||  || — || October 26, 2011 || Haleakala || Pan-STARRS ||  || align=right | 3.1 km || 
|-id=623 bgcolor=#d6d6d6
| 533623 ||  || — || May 22, 2014 || Mount Lemmon || Mount Lemmon Survey ||  || align=right | 2.5 km || 
|-id=624 bgcolor=#d6d6d6
| 533624 ||  || — || January 30, 2008 || Mount Lemmon || Mount Lemmon Survey ||  || align=right | 1.8 km || 
|-id=625 bgcolor=#d6d6d6
| 533625 ||  || — || April 4, 2014 || Kitt Peak || Spacewatch ||  || align=right | 2.3 km || 
|-id=626 bgcolor=#d6d6d6
| 533626 ||  || — || April 27, 2009 || Mount Lemmon || Mount Lemmon Survey ||  || align=right | 2.0 km || 
|-id=627 bgcolor=#fefefe
| 533627 ||  || — || April 15, 2007 || Kitt Peak || Spacewatch ||  || align=right data-sort-value="0.51" | 510 m || 
|-id=628 bgcolor=#d6d6d6
| 533628 ||  || — || May 6, 2014 || Haleakala || Pan-STARRS ||  || align=right | 2.6 km || 
|-id=629 bgcolor=#fefefe
| 533629 ||  || — || May 27, 2014 || Mount Lemmon || Mount Lemmon Survey ||  || align=right data-sort-value="0.83" | 830 m || 
|-id=630 bgcolor=#d6d6d6
| 533630 ||  || — || January 18, 2008 || Mount Lemmon || Mount Lemmon Survey ||  || align=right | 2.0 km || 
|-id=631 bgcolor=#d6d6d6
| 533631 ||  || — || November 2, 2010 || Mount Lemmon || Mount Lemmon Survey || THB || align=right | 3.2 km || 
|-id=632 bgcolor=#d6d6d6
| 533632 ||  || — || March 8, 2008 || Mount Lemmon || Mount Lemmon Survey ||  || align=right | 1.9 km || 
|-id=633 bgcolor=#d6d6d6
| 533633 ||  || — || March 28, 2008 || Mount Lemmon || Mount Lemmon Survey || THM || align=right | 1.8 km || 
|-id=634 bgcolor=#fefefe
| 533634 ||  || — || October 17, 2012 || Haleakala || Pan-STARRS || H || align=right data-sort-value="0.73" | 730 m || 
|-id=635 bgcolor=#fefefe
| 533635 ||  || — || May 28, 2014 || Haleakala || Pan-STARRS || H || align=right data-sort-value="0.67" | 670 m || 
|-id=636 bgcolor=#fefefe
| 533636 ||  || — || October 8, 2012 || Mount Lemmon || Mount Lemmon Survey || H || align=right data-sort-value="0.42" | 420 m || 
|-id=637 bgcolor=#fefefe
| 533637 ||  || — || November 24, 2012 || Haleakala || Pan-STARRS || H || align=right data-sort-value="0.68" | 680 m || 
|-id=638 bgcolor=#FFC2E0
| 533638 ||  || — || May 27, 2014 || Haleakala || Pan-STARRS || APO || align=right data-sort-value="0.30" | 300 m || 
|-id=639 bgcolor=#d6d6d6
| 533639 ||  || — || May 10, 2014 || Haleakala || Pan-STARRS ||  || align=right | 2.8 km || 
|-id=640 bgcolor=#fefefe
| 533640 ||  || — || February 4, 2011 || Catalina || CSS || H || align=right data-sort-value="0.50" | 500 m || 
|-id=641 bgcolor=#d6d6d6
| 533641 ||  || — || October 3, 1999 || Kitt Peak || Spacewatch || EUP || align=right | 2.8 km || 
|-id=642 bgcolor=#d6d6d6
| 533642 ||  || — || May 21, 2014 || Haleakala || Pan-STARRS ||  || align=right | 2.9 km || 
|-id=643 bgcolor=#d6d6d6
| 533643 ||  || — || January 5, 2013 || Mount Lemmon || Mount Lemmon Survey ||  || align=right | 2.1 km || 
|-id=644 bgcolor=#fefefe
| 533644 ||  || — || September 9, 2008 || Mount Lemmon || Mount Lemmon Survey ||  || align=right data-sort-value="0.59" | 590 m || 
|-id=645 bgcolor=#fefefe
| 533645 ||  || — || August 20, 2004 || Kitt Peak || Spacewatch ||  || align=right data-sort-value="0.59" | 590 m || 
|-id=646 bgcolor=#fefefe
| 533646 ||  || — || December 9, 2004 || Kitt Peak || Spacewatch || H || align=right data-sort-value="0.70" | 700 m || 
|-id=647 bgcolor=#d6d6d6
| 533647 ||  || — || May 7, 2014 || Haleakala || Pan-STARRS ||  || align=right | 2.5 km || 
|-id=648 bgcolor=#d6d6d6
| 533648 ||  || — || May 7, 2014 || Haleakala || Pan-STARRS ||  || align=right | 2.3 km || 
|-id=649 bgcolor=#d6d6d6
| 533649 ||  || — || May 20, 2014 || Haleakala || Pan-STARRS ||  || align=right | 2.0 km || 
|-id=650 bgcolor=#d6d6d6
| 533650 ||  || — || November 12, 2006 || Mount Lemmon || Mount Lemmon Survey ||  || align=right | 2.3 km || 
|-id=651 bgcolor=#d6d6d6
| 533651 ||  || — || January 10, 2007 || Kitt Peak || Spacewatch ||  || align=right | 3.0 km || 
|-id=652 bgcolor=#d6d6d6
| 533652 ||  || — || May 21, 2014 || Haleakala || Pan-STARRS ||  || align=right | 1.8 km || 
|-id=653 bgcolor=#d6d6d6
| 533653 ||  || — || November 6, 2010 || Mount Lemmon || Mount Lemmon Survey ||  || align=right | 2.8 km || 
|-id=654 bgcolor=#d6d6d6
| 533654 ||  || — || May 23, 2014 || Haleakala || Pan-STARRS ||  || align=right | 2.0 km || 
|-id=655 bgcolor=#d6d6d6
| 533655 ||  || — || May 23, 2014 || Haleakala || Pan-STARRS ||  || align=right | 2.2 km || 
|-id=656 bgcolor=#d6d6d6
| 533656 ||  || — || May 7, 2014 || Haleakala || Pan-STARRS ||  || align=right | 2.1 km || 
|-id=657 bgcolor=#d6d6d6
| 533657 ||  || — || May 23, 2014 || Haleakala || Pan-STARRS ||  || align=right | 2.5 km || 
|-id=658 bgcolor=#d6d6d6
| 533658 ||  || — || February 15, 2013 || Haleakala || Pan-STARRS ||  || align=right | 2.0 km || 
|-id=659 bgcolor=#d6d6d6
| 533659 ||  || — || March 5, 2013 || Haleakala || Pan-STARRS ||  || align=right | 2.5 km || 
|-id=660 bgcolor=#d6d6d6
| 533660 ||  || — || May 28, 2014 || Haleakala || Pan-STARRS ||  || align=right | 2.1 km || 
|-id=661 bgcolor=#fefefe
| 533661 ||  || — || February 17, 2007 || Mount Lemmon || Mount Lemmon Survey ||  || align=right data-sort-value="0.65" | 650 m || 
|-id=662 bgcolor=#fefefe
| 533662 ||  || — || May 28, 2014 || Haleakala || Pan-STARRS ||  || align=right data-sort-value="0.70" | 700 m || 
|-id=663 bgcolor=#d6d6d6
| 533663 ||  || — || December 25, 2011 || Mount Lemmon || Mount Lemmon Survey ||  || align=right | 3.3 km || 
|-id=664 bgcolor=#fefefe
| 533664 ||  || — || April 22, 2007 || Kitt Peak || Spacewatch ||  || align=right data-sort-value="0.65" | 650 m || 
|-id=665 bgcolor=#fefefe
| 533665 ||  || — || October 9, 2012 || Mount Lemmon || Mount Lemmon Survey || H || align=right data-sort-value="0.56" | 560 m || 
|-id=666 bgcolor=#d6d6d6
| 533666 ||  || — || May 7, 2014 || Haleakala || Pan-STARRS ||  || align=right | 2.1 km || 
|-id=667 bgcolor=#fefefe
| 533667 ||  || — || July 18, 2007 || Mount Lemmon || Mount Lemmon Survey ||  || align=right data-sort-value="0.59" | 590 m || 
|-id=668 bgcolor=#d6d6d6
| 533668 ||  || — || May 6, 2014 || Haleakala || Pan-STARRS ||  || align=right | 2.0 km || 
|-id=669 bgcolor=#fefefe
| 533669 ||  || — || May 7, 2014 || Haleakala || Pan-STARRS ||  || align=right data-sort-value="0.61" | 610 m || 
|-id=670 bgcolor=#fefefe
| 533670 ||  || — || June 5, 2014 || Haleakala || Pan-STARRS || H || align=right data-sort-value="0.85" | 850 m || 
|-id=671 bgcolor=#FFC2E0
| 533671 ||  || — || June 15, 2013 || Haleakala || Pan-STARRS || APO +1kmPHA || align=right | 2.2 km || 
|-id=672 bgcolor=#d6d6d6
| 533672 ||  || — || November 7, 2010 || Mount Lemmon || Mount Lemmon Survey ||  || align=right | 2.9 km || 
|-id=673 bgcolor=#fefefe
| 533673 ||  || — || October 20, 2012 || Haleakala || Pan-STARRS || H || align=right data-sort-value="0.60" | 600 m || 
|-id=674 bgcolor=#fefefe
| 533674 ||  || — || November 1, 2011 || Kitt Peak || Spacewatch ||  || align=right | 1.2 km || 
|-id=675 bgcolor=#fefefe
| 533675 ||  || — || July 1, 2011 || Haleakala || Pan-STARRS ||  || align=right data-sort-value="0.79" | 790 m || 
|-id=676 bgcolor=#C2E0FF
| 533676 ||  || — || February 10, 2011 || Haleakala || Pan-STARRS || cubewano (cold)critical || align=right | 246 km || 
|-id=677 bgcolor=#fefefe
| 533677 ||  || — || June 7, 2014 || Haleakala || Pan-STARRS || H || align=right data-sort-value="0.61" | 610 m || 
|-id=678 bgcolor=#d6d6d6
| 533678 ||  || — || February 14, 2013 || Haleakala || Pan-STARRS ||  || align=right | 2.7 km || 
|-id=679 bgcolor=#fefefe
| 533679 ||  || — || October 14, 2007 || Mount Lemmon || Mount Lemmon Survey ||  || align=right data-sort-value="0.86" | 860 m || 
|-id=680 bgcolor=#fefefe
| 533680 ||  || — || October 2, 2003 || Kitt Peak || Spacewatch ||  || align=right data-sort-value="0.77" | 770 m || 
|-id=681 bgcolor=#fefefe
| 533681 ||  || — || February 14, 2013 || Haleakala || Pan-STARRS ||  || align=right data-sort-value="0.85" | 850 m || 
|-id=682 bgcolor=#d6d6d6
| 533682 ||  || — || June 4, 2014 || Haleakala || Pan-STARRS ||  || align=right | 3.5 km || 
|-id=683 bgcolor=#d6d6d6
| 533683 ||  || — || April 14, 2008 || Mount Lemmon || Mount Lemmon Survey ||  || align=right | 2.4 km || 
|-id=684 bgcolor=#d6d6d6
| 533684 ||  || — || October 8, 2004 || Kitt Peak || Spacewatch ||  || align=right | 2.6 km || 
|-id=685 bgcolor=#fefefe
| 533685 ||  || — || June 22, 2006 || Kitt Peak || Spacewatch ||  || align=right data-sort-value="0.81" | 810 m || 
|-id=686 bgcolor=#fefefe
| 533686 ||  || — || August 31, 2012 || Haleakala || Pan-STARRS || H || align=right data-sort-value="0.90" | 900 m || 
|-id=687 bgcolor=#d6d6d6
| 533687 ||  || — || December 23, 2012 || Haleakala || Pan-STARRS || Tj (2.99) || align=right | 2.6 km || 
|-id=688 bgcolor=#fefefe
| 533688 ||  || — || November 8, 2007 || Catalina || CSS ||  || align=right data-sort-value="0.90" | 900 m || 
|-id=689 bgcolor=#d6d6d6
| 533689 ||  || — || April 3, 2008 || Mount Lemmon || Mount Lemmon Survey ||  || align=right | 2.5 km || 
|-id=690 bgcolor=#d6d6d6
| 533690 ||  || — || March 7, 2013 || Mount Lemmon || Mount Lemmon Survey ||  || align=right | 2.4 km || 
|-id=691 bgcolor=#d6d6d6
| 533691 ||  || — || June 22, 2014 || Mount Lemmon || Mount Lemmon Survey ||  || align=right | 2.7 km || 
|-id=692 bgcolor=#fefefe
| 533692 ||  || — || October 23, 2003 || Kitt Peak || Spacewatch ||  || align=right data-sort-value="0.65" | 650 m || 
|-id=693 bgcolor=#fefefe
| 533693 ||  || — || April 25, 2011 || Mount Lemmon || Mount Lemmon Survey || H || align=right data-sort-value="0.64" | 640 m || 
|-id=694 bgcolor=#d6d6d6
| 533694 ||  || — || May 23, 2014 || Haleakala || Pan-STARRS ||  || align=right | 2.8 km || 
|-id=695 bgcolor=#fefefe
| 533695 ||  || — || November 30, 2011 || Kitt Peak || Spacewatch ||  || align=right data-sort-value="0.59" | 590 m || 
|-id=696 bgcolor=#fefefe
| 533696 ||  || — || September 20, 2007 || Kitt Peak || Spacewatch || NYS || align=right data-sort-value="0.50" | 500 m || 
|-id=697 bgcolor=#fefefe
| 533697 ||  || — || October 26, 2011 || Haleakala || Pan-STARRS ||  || align=right data-sort-value="0.55" | 550 m || 
|-id=698 bgcolor=#d6d6d6
| 533698 ||  || — || March 27, 2008 || Mount Lemmon || Mount Lemmon Survey ||  || align=right | 2.6 km || 
|-id=699 bgcolor=#fefefe
| 533699 ||  || — || December 6, 2011 || Haleakala || Pan-STARRS ||  || align=right data-sort-value="0.59" | 590 m || 
|-id=700 bgcolor=#fefefe
| 533700 ||  || — || June 27, 2014 || Haleakala || Pan-STARRS ||  || align=right data-sort-value="0.65" | 650 m || 
|}

533701–533800 

|-bgcolor=#fefefe
| 533701 ||  || — || December 23, 2012 || Haleakala || Pan-STARRS || H || align=right data-sort-value="0.77" | 770 m || 
|-id=702 bgcolor=#d6d6d6
| 533702 ||  || — || April 5, 2008 || Mount Lemmon || Mount Lemmon Survey ||  || align=right | 1.9 km || 
|-id=703 bgcolor=#fefefe
| 533703 ||  || — || June 28, 2014 || Haleakala || Pan-STARRS ||  || align=right data-sort-value="0.62" | 620 m || 
|-id=704 bgcolor=#C2E0FF
| 533704 ||  || — || August 18, 2010 || Haleakala || Pan-STARRS || cubewano?critical || align=right | 257 km || 
|-id=705 bgcolor=#E9E9E9
| 533705 ||  || — || October 22, 2006 || Catalina || CSS ||  || align=right | 1.0 km || 
|-id=706 bgcolor=#E9E9E9
| 533706 ||  || — || February 14, 2013 || Haleakala || Pan-STARRS ||  || align=right | 2.0 km || 
|-id=707 bgcolor=#fefefe
| 533707 ||  || — || June 21, 2014 || Haleakala || Pan-STARRS ||  || align=right data-sort-value="0.71" | 710 m || 
|-id=708 bgcolor=#fefefe
| 533708 ||  || — || June 24, 2014 || Haleakala || Pan-STARRS ||  || align=right data-sort-value="0.85" | 850 m || 
|-id=709 bgcolor=#d6d6d6
| 533709 ||  || — || September 16, 2009 || Kitt Peak || Spacewatch ||  || align=right | 2.8 km || 
|-id=710 bgcolor=#d6d6d6
| 533710 ||  || — || June 3, 2014 || Haleakala || Pan-STARRS ||  || align=right | 3.0 km || 
|-id=711 bgcolor=#FA8072
| 533711 ||  || — || August 7, 2007 || Siding Spring || SSS ||  || align=right data-sort-value="0.62" | 620 m || 
|-id=712 bgcolor=#d6d6d6
| 533712 ||  || — || August 10, 2009 || Kitt Peak || Spacewatch ||  || align=right | 1.9 km || 
|-id=713 bgcolor=#fefefe
| 533713 ||  || — || November 19, 2003 || Anderson Mesa || LONEOS ||  || align=right data-sort-value="0.89" | 890 m || 
|-id=714 bgcolor=#fefefe
| 533714 ||  || — || February 3, 2013 || Haleakala || Pan-STARRS ||  || align=right data-sort-value="0.60" | 600 m || 
|-id=715 bgcolor=#d6d6d6
| 533715 ||  || — || May 5, 2014 || Mount Lemmon || Mount Lemmon Survey ||  || align=right | 2.3 km || 
|-id=716 bgcolor=#fefefe
| 533716 ||  || — || September 8, 2000 || Kitt Peak || Spacewatch ||  || align=right data-sort-value="0.62" | 620 m || 
|-id=717 bgcolor=#d6d6d6
| 533717 ||  || — || November 24, 2009 || Kitt Peak || Spacewatch ||  || align=right | 2.8 km || 
|-id=718 bgcolor=#fefefe
| 533718 ||  || — || September 27, 2007 || Mount Lemmon || Mount Lemmon Survey ||  || align=right data-sort-value="0.82" | 820 m || 
|-id=719 bgcolor=#fefefe
| 533719 ||  || — || January 11, 2008 || Kitt Peak || Spacewatch || H || align=right data-sort-value="0.79" | 790 m || 
|-id=720 bgcolor=#fefefe
| 533720 ||  || — || November 3, 2007 || Mount Lemmon || Mount Lemmon Survey ||  || align=right data-sort-value="0.67" | 670 m || 
|-id=721 bgcolor=#fefefe
| 533721 ||  || — || September 13, 2007 || Socorro || LINEAR ||  || align=right data-sort-value="0.71" | 710 m || 
|-id=722 bgcolor=#FFC2E0
| 533722 ||  || — || May 6, 2014 || Haleakala || Pan-STARRS || APO +1kmPHAcritical || align=right data-sort-value="0.7" | 700 m || 
|-id=723 bgcolor=#fefefe
| 533723 ||  || — || May 20, 2011 || Haleakala || Pan-STARRS || H || align=right data-sort-value="0.65" | 650 m || 
|-id=724 bgcolor=#fefefe
| 533724 ||  || — || June 28, 2014 || Haleakala || Pan-STARRS ||  || align=right data-sort-value="0.61" | 610 m || 
|-id=725 bgcolor=#fefefe
| 533725 ||  || — || January 2, 2009 || Mount Lemmon || Mount Lemmon Survey ||  || align=right data-sort-value="0.68" | 680 m || 
|-id=726 bgcolor=#FA8072
| 533726 ||  || — || June 5, 2014 || Haleakala || Pan-STARRS ||  || align=right data-sort-value="0.71" | 710 m || 
|-id=727 bgcolor=#fefefe
| 533727 ||  || — || September 13, 2007 || Mount Lemmon || Mount Lemmon Survey ||  || align=right data-sort-value="0.55" | 550 m || 
|-id=728 bgcolor=#fefefe
| 533728 ||  || — || December 22, 2008 || Kitt Peak || Spacewatch ||  || align=right data-sort-value="0.56" | 560 m || 
|-id=729 bgcolor=#E9E9E9
| 533729 ||  || — || June 8, 2014 || Haleakala || Pan-STARRS ||  || align=right | 3.2 km || 
|-id=730 bgcolor=#fefefe
| 533730 ||  || — || October 18, 2007 || Mount Lemmon || Mount Lemmon Survey ||  || align=right data-sort-value="0.71" | 710 m || 
|-id=731 bgcolor=#d6d6d6
| 533731 ||  || — || January 19, 2012 || Haleakala || Pan-STARRS || 7:4 || align=right | 3.4 km || 
|-id=732 bgcolor=#fefefe
| 533732 ||  || — || July 7, 2014 || Haleakala || Pan-STARRS ||  || align=right data-sort-value="0.68" | 680 m || 
|-id=733 bgcolor=#d6d6d6
| 533733 ||  || — || March 14, 2013 || Catalina || CSS ||  || align=right | 2.7 km || 
|-id=734 bgcolor=#fefefe
| 533734 ||  || — || October 19, 2011 || Mount Lemmon || Mount Lemmon Survey ||  || align=right data-sort-value="0.60" | 600 m || 
|-id=735 bgcolor=#fefefe
| 533735 ||  || — || July 3, 2014 || Haleakala || Pan-STARRS ||  || align=right data-sort-value="0.68" | 680 m || 
|-id=736 bgcolor=#FA8072
| 533736 ||  || — || November 3, 2007 || Socorro || LINEAR || PHO || align=right data-sort-value="0.99" | 990 m || 
|-id=737 bgcolor=#fefefe
| 533737 ||  || — || September 22, 2003 || Kitt Peak || Spacewatch ||  || align=right data-sort-value="0.65" | 650 m || 
|-id=738 bgcolor=#fefefe
| 533738 ||  || — || September 10, 2007 || Kitt Peak || Spacewatch ||  || align=right data-sort-value="0.58" | 580 m || 
|-id=739 bgcolor=#d6d6d6
| 533739 ||  || — || June 2, 2014 || Haleakala || Pan-STARRS ||  || align=right | 2.5 km || 
|-id=740 bgcolor=#fefefe
| 533740 ||  || — || October 24, 2011 || Haleakala || Pan-STARRS ||  || align=right data-sort-value="0.55" | 550 m || 
|-id=741 bgcolor=#fefefe
| 533741 ||  || — || April 9, 2010 || Kitt Peak || Spacewatch ||  || align=right data-sort-value="0.61" | 610 m || 
|-id=742 bgcolor=#fefefe
| 533742 ||  || — || October 26, 2011 || Haleakala || Pan-STARRS ||  || align=right data-sort-value="0.52" | 520 m || 
|-id=743 bgcolor=#fefefe
| 533743 ||  || — || December 25, 2011 || Kitt Peak || Spacewatch ||  || align=right data-sort-value="0.59" | 590 m || 
|-id=744 bgcolor=#FA8072
| 533744 ||  || — || January 21, 2012 || Kitt Peak || Spacewatch ||  || align=right data-sort-value="0.72" | 720 m || 
|-id=745 bgcolor=#fefefe
| 533745 ||  || — || July 25, 2014 || Haleakala || Pan-STARRS ||  || align=right data-sort-value="0.64" | 640 m || 
|-id=746 bgcolor=#fefefe
| 533746 ||  || — || October 27, 2011 || Catalina || CSS ||  || align=right data-sort-value="0.52" | 520 m || 
|-id=747 bgcolor=#fefefe
| 533747 ||  || — || October 25, 2011 || XuYi || PMO NEO ||  || align=right data-sort-value="0.62" | 620 m || 
|-id=748 bgcolor=#fefefe
| 533748 ||  || — || November 19, 2001 || Socorro || LINEAR ||  || align=right data-sort-value="0.62" | 620 m || 
|-id=749 bgcolor=#fefefe
| 533749 ||  || — || October 27, 2011 || Mount Lemmon || Mount Lemmon Survey ||  || align=right data-sort-value="0.54" | 540 m || 
|-id=750 bgcolor=#fefefe
| 533750 ||  || — || May 24, 2006 || Mount Lemmon || Mount Lemmon Survey ||  || align=right data-sort-value="0.54" | 540 m || 
|-id=751 bgcolor=#fefefe
| 533751 ||  || — || June 26, 2014 || Haleakala || Pan-STARRS ||  || align=right data-sort-value="0.71" | 710 m || 
|-id=752 bgcolor=#fefefe
| 533752 ||  || — || October 9, 2007 || Mount Lemmon || Mount Lemmon Survey ||  || align=right data-sort-value="0.71" | 710 m || 
|-id=753 bgcolor=#fefefe
| 533753 ||  || — || June 26, 2014 || Haleakala || Pan-STARRS ||  || align=right data-sort-value="0.86" | 860 m || 
|-id=754 bgcolor=#fefefe
| 533754 ||  || — || November 19, 2008 || Kitt Peak || Spacewatch ||  || align=right data-sort-value="0.58" | 580 m || 
|-id=755 bgcolor=#fefefe
| 533755 ||  || — || September 9, 2004 || Kitt Peak || Spacewatch ||  || align=right data-sort-value="0.62" | 620 m || 
|-id=756 bgcolor=#E9E9E9
| 533756 ||  || — || December 31, 2011 || Kitt Peak || Spacewatch ||  || align=right data-sort-value="0.90" | 900 m || 
|-id=757 bgcolor=#fefefe
| 533757 ||  || — || November 3, 2011 || Kitt Peak || Spacewatch ||  || align=right data-sort-value="0.56" | 560 m || 
|-id=758 bgcolor=#fefefe
| 533758 ||  || — || February 24, 2008 || Mount Lemmon || Mount Lemmon Survey ||  || align=right data-sort-value="0.73" | 730 m || 
|-id=759 bgcolor=#fefefe
| 533759 ||  || — || September 5, 2007 || Mount Lemmon || Mount Lemmon Survey ||  || align=right data-sort-value="0.75" | 750 m || 
|-id=760 bgcolor=#fefefe
| 533760 ||  || — || July 26, 2014 || Haleakala || Pan-STARRS ||  || align=right data-sort-value="0.87" | 870 m || 
|-id=761 bgcolor=#fefefe
| 533761 ||  || — || October 3, 2003 || Kitt Peak || Spacewatch ||  || align=right data-sort-value="0.62" | 620 m || 
|-id=762 bgcolor=#fefefe
| 533762 ||  || — || March 5, 2013 || Haleakala || Pan-STARRS ||  || align=right data-sort-value="0.64" | 640 m || 
|-id=763 bgcolor=#d6d6d6
| 533763 ||  || — || October 2, 2008 || Mount Lemmon || Mount Lemmon Survey || 7:4 || align=right | 3.1 km || 
|-id=764 bgcolor=#fefefe
| 533764 ||  || — || October 23, 2011 || Haleakala || Pan-STARRS ||  || align=right data-sort-value="0.72" | 720 m || 
|-id=765 bgcolor=#d6d6d6
| 533765 ||  || — || February 14, 2013 || Haleakala || Pan-STARRS ||  || align=right | 3.4 km || 
|-id=766 bgcolor=#fefefe
| 533766 ||  || — || May 23, 2014 || Haleakala || Pan-STARRS || H || align=right data-sort-value="0.75" | 750 m || 
|-id=767 bgcolor=#d6d6d6
| 533767 ||  || — || March 12, 2008 || Kitt Peak || Spacewatch ||  || align=right | 2.4 km || 
|-id=768 bgcolor=#fefefe
| 533768 ||  || — || July 3, 2014 || Haleakala || Pan-STARRS || V || align=right data-sort-value="0.48" | 480 m || 
|-id=769 bgcolor=#fefefe
| 533769 ||  || — || August 21, 2007 || Anderson Mesa || LONEOS ||  || align=right data-sort-value="0.68" | 680 m || 
|-id=770 bgcolor=#fefefe
| 533770 ||  || — || September 26, 2011 || Haleakala || Pan-STARRS ||  || align=right data-sort-value="0.49" | 490 m || 
|-id=771 bgcolor=#fefefe
| 533771 ||  || — || March 31, 2013 || Mount Lemmon || Mount Lemmon Survey ||  || align=right data-sort-value="0.79" | 790 m || 
|-id=772 bgcolor=#d6d6d6
| 533772 ||  || — || March 29, 2008 || Kitt Peak || Spacewatch || TIR || align=right | 2.4 km || 
|-id=773 bgcolor=#fefefe
| 533773 ||  || — || May 25, 2014 || Haleakala || Pan-STARRS ||  || align=right data-sort-value="0.79" | 790 m || 
|-id=774 bgcolor=#fefefe
| 533774 ||  || — || March 27, 1996 || Kitt Peak || Spacewatch ||  || align=right data-sort-value="0.51" | 510 m || 
|-id=775 bgcolor=#fefefe
| 533775 ||  || — || May 25, 2014 || Haleakala || Pan-STARRS ||  || align=right data-sort-value="0.85" | 850 m || 
|-id=776 bgcolor=#fefefe
| 533776 ||  || — || September 13, 2007 || Mount Lemmon || Mount Lemmon Survey ||  || align=right data-sort-value="0.59" | 590 m || 
|-id=777 bgcolor=#fefefe
| 533777 ||  || — || October 8, 2007 || Mount Lemmon || Mount Lemmon Survey || NYS || align=right data-sort-value="0.56" | 560 m || 
|-id=778 bgcolor=#fefefe
| 533778 ||  || — || October 1, 2011 || Kitt Peak || Spacewatch ||  || align=right data-sort-value="0.62" | 620 m || 
|-id=779 bgcolor=#fefefe
| 533779 ||  || — || September 26, 2011 || Mount Lemmon || Mount Lemmon Survey ||  || align=right data-sort-value="0.58" | 580 m || 
|-id=780 bgcolor=#fefefe
| 533780 ||  || — || November 30, 2005 || Kitt Peak || Spacewatch ||  || align=right data-sort-value="0.64" | 640 m || 
|-id=781 bgcolor=#fefefe
| 533781 ||  || — || May 25, 2014 || Haleakala || Pan-STARRS ||  || align=right data-sort-value="0.72" | 720 m || 
|-id=782 bgcolor=#fefefe
| 533782 ||  || — || February 9, 2013 || Haleakala || Pan-STARRS ||  || align=right data-sort-value="0.67" | 670 m || 
|-id=783 bgcolor=#fefefe
| 533783 ||  || — || December 2, 2004 || Kitt Peak || Spacewatch ||  || align=right data-sort-value="0.68" | 680 m || 
|-id=784 bgcolor=#fefefe
| 533784 ||  || — || September 12, 2007 || Kitt Peak || Spacewatch ||  || align=right data-sort-value="0.65" | 650 m || 
|-id=785 bgcolor=#fefefe
| 533785 ||  || — || September 18, 2007 || Kitt Peak || Spacewatch ||  || align=right data-sort-value="0.82" | 820 m || 
|-id=786 bgcolor=#d6d6d6
| 533786 ||  || — || June 29, 2014 || Haleakala || Pan-STARRS ||  || align=right | 2.9 km || 
|-id=787 bgcolor=#fefefe
| 533787 ||  || — || November 1, 2008 || Mount Lemmon || Mount Lemmon Survey || (2076) || align=right data-sort-value="0.72" | 720 m || 
|-id=788 bgcolor=#fefefe
| 533788 ||  || — || November 8, 2008 || Mount Lemmon || Mount Lemmon Survey ||  || align=right data-sort-value="0.67" | 670 m || 
|-id=789 bgcolor=#fefefe
| 533789 ||  || — || January 19, 2012 || Haleakala || Pan-STARRS ||  || align=right data-sort-value="0.96" | 960 m || 
|-id=790 bgcolor=#fefefe
| 533790 ||  || — || February 17, 2013 || Kitt Peak || Spacewatch ||  || align=right data-sort-value="0.73" | 730 m || 
|-id=791 bgcolor=#fefefe
| 533791 ||  || — || November 1, 2011 || Mount Lemmon || Mount Lemmon Survey ||  || align=right data-sort-value="0.79" | 790 m || 
|-id=792 bgcolor=#fefefe
| 533792 ||  || — || June 28, 2014 || Haleakala || Pan-STARRS ||  || align=right data-sort-value="0.65" | 650 m || 
|-id=793 bgcolor=#fefefe
| 533793 ||  || — || September 23, 2011 || Haleakala || Pan-STARRS ||  || align=right data-sort-value="0.89" | 890 m || 
|-id=794 bgcolor=#fefefe
| 533794 ||  || — || March 16, 2013 || Kitt Peak || Spacewatch ||  || align=right data-sort-value="0.77" | 770 m || 
|-id=795 bgcolor=#fefefe
| 533795 ||  || — || November 3, 2007 || Mount Lemmon || Mount Lemmon Survey ||  || align=right data-sort-value="0.68" | 680 m || 
|-id=796 bgcolor=#E9E9E9
| 533796 ||  || — || February 11, 2004 || Kitt Peak || Spacewatch ||  || align=right | 1.1 km || 
|-id=797 bgcolor=#fefefe
| 533797 ||  || — || November 14, 2007 || Kitt Peak || Spacewatch ||  || align=right data-sort-value="0.71" | 710 m || 
|-id=798 bgcolor=#fefefe
| 533798 ||  || — || May 23, 2006 || Kitt Peak || Spacewatch ||  || align=right data-sort-value="0.69" | 690 m || 
|-id=799 bgcolor=#fefefe
| 533799 ||  || — || April 30, 2006 || Kitt Peak || Spacewatch ||  || align=right data-sort-value="0.64" | 640 m || 
|-id=800 bgcolor=#fefefe
| 533800 ||  || — || July 27, 2014 || Haleakala || Pan-STARRS ||  || align=right data-sort-value="0.82" | 820 m || 
|}

533801–533900 

|-bgcolor=#fefefe
| 533801 ||  || — || August 2, 2010 || Socorro || LINEAR ||  || align=right data-sort-value="0.82" | 820 m || 
|-id=802 bgcolor=#fefefe
| 533802 ||  || — || August 21, 2007 || Anderson Mesa || LONEOS ||  || align=right data-sort-value="0.58" | 580 m || 
|-id=803 bgcolor=#fefefe
| 533803 ||  || — || July 27, 2014 || Haleakala || Pan-STARRS ||  || align=right data-sort-value="0.64" | 640 m || 
|-id=804 bgcolor=#d6d6d6
| 533804 ||  || — || May 7, 2014 || Haleakala || Pan-STARRS || Tj (2.96) || align=right | 3.3 km || 
|-id=805 bgcolor=#fefefe
| 533805 ||  || — || July 28, 2014 || Haleakala || Pan-STARRS ||  || align=right data-sort-value="0.68" | 680 m || 
|-id=806 bgcolor=#fefefe
| 533806 ||  || — || October 26, 2011 || Haleakala || Pan-STARRS ||  || align=right data-sort-value="0.56" | 560 m || 
|-id=807 bgcolor=#fefefe
| 533807 ||  || — || August 30, 2011 || Haleakala || Pan-STARRS ||  || align=right data-sort-value="0.63" | 630 m || 
|-id=808 bgcolor=#fefefe
| 533808 ||  || — || October 2, 1997 || Caussols || ODAS ||  || align=right data-sort-value="0.63" | 630 m || 
|-id=809 bgcolor=#d6d6d6
| 533809 ||  || — || July 25, 2014 || Haleakala || Pan-STARRS || 3:2 || align=right | 4.0 km || 
|-id=810 bgcolor=#fefefe
| 533810 ||  || — || September 23, 2011 || Haleakala || Pan-STARRS ||  || align=right data-sort-value="0.54" | 540 m || 
|-id=811 bgcolor=#fefefe
| 533811 ||  || — || June 9, 1999 || Kitt Peak || Spacewatch ||  || align=right data-sort-value="0.65" | 650 m || 
|-id=812 bgcolor=#fefefe
| 533812 ||  || — || September 11, 2007 || Kitt Peak || Spacewatch || MAS || align=right data-sort-value="0.62" | 620 m || 
|-id=813 bgcolor=#fefefe
| 533813 ||  || — || September 23, 2011 || Haleakala || Pan-STARRS ||  || align=right data-sort-value="0.60" | 600 m || 
|-id=814 bgcolor=#fefefe
| 533814 ||  || — || June 24, 2014 || Haleakala || Pan-STARRS || H || align=right data-sort-value="0.49" | 490 m || 
|-id=815 bgcolor=#fefefe
| 533815 ||  || — || October 2, 2003 || Kitt Peak || Spacewatch ||  || align=right data-sort-value="0.68" | 680 m || 
|-id=816 bgcolor=#fefefe
| 533816 ||  || — || December 6, 2007 || Kitt Peak || Spacewatch ||  || align=right data-sort-value="0.68" | 680 m || 
|-id=817 bgcolor=#fefefe
| 533817 ||  || — || October 21, 2003 || Kitt Peak || Spacewatch ||  || align=right data-sort-value="0.71" | 710 m || 
|-id=818 bgcolor=#fefefe
| 533818 ||  || — || December 18, 2007 || Kitt Peak || Spacewatch ||  || align=right data-sort-value="0.68" | 680 m || 
|-id=819 bgcolor=#fefefe
| 533819 ||  || — || July 27, 2014 || Haleakala || Pan-STARRS ||  || align=right data-sort-value="0.76" | 760 m || 
|-id=820 bgcolor=#fefefe
| 533820 ||  || — || February 4, 2012 || Haleakala || Pan-STARRS ||  || align=right data-sort-value="0.76" | 760 m || 
|-id=821 bgcolor=#fefefe
| 533821 ||  || — || July 27, 2014 || Haleakala || Pan-STARRS ||  || align=right data-sort-value="0.82" | 820 m || 
|-id=822 bgcolor=#fefefe
| 533822 ||  || — || June 29, 2014 || Haleakala || Pan-STARRS ||  || align=right data-sort-value="0.89" | 890 m || 
|-id=823 bgcolor=#fefefe
| 533823 ||  || — || September 8, 2007 || Mount Lemmon || Mount Lemmon Survey ||  || align=right data-sort-value="0.57" | 570 m || 
|-id=824 bgcolor=#fefefe
| 533824 ||  || — || October 19, 2007 || Catalina || CSS ||  || align=right data-sort-value="0.71" | 710 m || 
|-id=825 bgcolor=#fefefe
| 533825 ||  || — || September 22, 2011 || Kitt Peak || Spacewatch ||  || align=right data-sort-value="0.57" | 570 m || 
|-id=826 bgcolor=#d6d6d6
| 533826 ||  || — || December 2, 2010 || Mount Lemmon || Mount Lemmon Survey ||  || align=right | 4.0 km || 
|-id=827 bgcolor=#fefefe
| 533827 ||  || — || September 28, 2011 || Kitt Peak || Spacewatch ||  || align=right data-sort-value="0.50" | 500 m || 
|-id=828 bgcolor=#fefefe
| 533828 ||  || — || December 25, 2011 || Mount Lemmon || Mount Lemmon Survey ||  || align=right data-sort-value="0.62" | 620 m || 
|-id=829 bgcolor=#fefefe
| 533829 ||  || — || September 5, 2007 || Catalina || CSS ||  || align=right data-sort-value="0.69" | 690 m || 
|-id=830 bgcolor=#fefefe
| 533830 ||  || — || July 8, 2014 || Haleakala || Pan-STARRS || H || align=right data-sort-value="0.49" | 490 m || 
|-id=831 bgcolor=#fefefe
| 533831 ||  || — || October 10, 2004 || Kitt Peak || Spacewatch ||  || align=right data-sort-value="0.45" | 450 m || 
|-id=832 bgcolor=#fefefe
| 533832 ||  || — || July 29, 2014 || Haleakala || Pan-STARRS ||  || align=right data-sort-value="0.58" | 580 m || 
|-id=833 bgcolor=#fefefe
| 533833 ||  || — || July 29, 2014 || Haleakala || Pan-STARRS ||  || align=right data-sort-value="0.79" | 790 m || 
|-id=834 bgcolor=#fefefe
| 533834 ||  || — || July 29, 2014 || Haleakala || Pan-STARRS || MAS || align=right data-sort-value="0.72" | 720 m || 
|-id=835 bgcolor=#E9E9E9
| 533835 ||  || — || October 1, 2010 || Catalina || CSS ||  || align=right data-sort-value="0.75" | 750 m || 
|-id=836 bgcolor=#fefefe
| 533836 ||  || — || October 23, 2003 || Kitt Peak || Spacewatch ||  || align=right data-sort-value="0.81" | 810 m || 
|-id=837 bgcolor=#fefefe
| 533837 ||  || — || September 13, 2007 || Kitt Peak || Spacewatch ||  || align=right data-sort-value="0.67" | 670 m || 
|-id=838 bgcolor=#fefefe
| 533838 ||  || — || September 4, 1999 || Kitt Peak || Spacewatch ||  || align=right data-sort-value="0.68" | 680 m || 
|-id=839 bgcolor=#fefefe
| 533839 ||  || — || October 19, 2003 || Kitt Peak || Spacewatch ||  || align=right data-sort-value="0.62" | 620 m || 
|-id=840 bgcolor=#fefefe
| 533840 ||  || — || July 26, 2014 || Haleakala || Pan-STARRS || NYS || align=right data-sort-value="0.58" | 580 m || 
|-id=841 bgcolor=#fefefe
| 533841 ||  || — || October 22, 2008 || Kitt Peak || Spacewatch ||  || align=right data-sort-value="0.63" | 630 m || 
|-id=842 bgcolor=#fefefe
| 533842 ||  || — || December 5, 2007 || Mount Lemmon || Mount Lemmon Survey ||  || align=right data-sort-value="0.82" | 820 m || 
|-id=843 bgcolor=#fefefe
| 533843 ||  || — || November 30, 2003 || Kitt Peak || Spacewatch ||  || align=right data-sort-value="0.59" | 590 m || 
|-id=844 bgcolor=#fefefe
| 533844 ||  || — || November 3, 2011 || Mount Lemmon || Mount Lemmon Survey ||  || align=right data-sort-value="0.58" | 580 m || 
|-id=845 bgcolor=#E9E9E9
| 533845 ||  || — || December 30, 2007 || Kitt Peak || Spacewatch ||  || align=right | 1.2 km || 
|-id=846 bgcolor=#fefefe
| 533846 ||  || — || September 24, 2007 || Kitt Peak || Spacewatch ||  || align=right data-sort-value="0.65" | 650 m || 
|-id=847 bgcolor=#fefefe
| 533847 ||  || — || January 16, 2005 || Kitt Peak || Spacewatch ||  || align=right data-sort-value="0.85" | 850 m || 
|-id=848 bgcolor=#fefefe
| 533848 ||  || — || April 7, 2013 || Mount Lemmon || Mount Lemmon Survey ||  || align=right data-sort-value="0.83" | 830 m || 
|-id=849 bgcolor=#FA8072
| 533849 ||  || — || June 30, 2014 || Mount Lemmon || Mount Lemmon Survey ||  || align=right | 1.6 km || 
|-id=850 bgcolor=#FA8072
| 533850 ||  || — || August 30, 2010 || La Sagra || OAM Obs. ||  || align=right data-sort-value="0.45" | 450 m || 
|-id=851 bgcolor=#fefefe
| 533851 ||  || — || October 15, 2007 || Catalina || CSS ||  || align=right data-sort-value="0.78" | 780 m || 
|-id=852 bgcolor=#fefefe
| 533852 ||  || — || November 14, 2007 || Kitt Peak || Spacewatch ||  || align=right data-sort-value="0.79" | 790 m || 
|-id=853 bgcolor=#fefefe
| 533853 ||  || — || November 19, 2003 || Kitt Peak || Spacewatch ||  || align=right data-sort-value="0.74" | 740 m || 
|-id=854 bgcolor=#d6d6d6
| 533854 ||  || — || February 1, 2006 || Kitt Peak || Spacewatch ||  || align=right | 2.5 km || 
|-id=855 bgcolor=#fefefe
| 533855 ||  || — || June 1, 2014 || Haleakala || Pan-STARRS ||  || align=right data-sort-value="0.71" | 710 m || 
|-id=856 bgcolor=#fefefe
| 533856 ||  || — || September 15, 2007 || Mount Lemmon || Mount Lemmon Survey ||  || align=right data-sort-value="0.55" | 550 m || 
|-id=857 bgcolor=#fefefe
| 533857 ||  || — || September 12, 2007 || Mount Lemmon || Mount Lemmon Survey ||  || align=right data-sort-value="0.62" | 620 m || 
|-id=858 bgcolor=#fefefe
| 533858 ||  || — || July 30, 2014 || Kitt Peak || Spacewatch ||  || align=right data-sort-value="0.52" | 520 m || 
|-id=859 bgcolor=#fefefe
| 533859 ||  || — || October 17, 1995 || Kitt Peak || Spacewatch ||  || align=right data-sort-value="0.83" | 830 m || 
|-id=860 bgcolor=#fefefe
| 533860 ||  || — || March 12, 2010 || Kitt Peak || Spacewatch ||  || align=right data-sort-value="0.67" | 670 m || 
|-id=861 bgcolor=#fefefe
| 533861 ||  || — || December 31, 2007 || Kitt Peak || Spacewatch ||  || align=right data-sort-value="0.87" | 870 m || 
|-id=862 bgcolor=#fefefe
| 533862 ||  || — || June 26, 2014 || Haleakala || Pan-STARRS ||  || align=right | 1.1 km || 
|-id=863 bgcolor=#d6d6d6
| 533863 ||  || — || June 30, 2014 || Haleakala || Pan-STARRS ||  || align=right | 2.5 km || 
|-id=864 bgcolor=#fefefe
| 533864 ||  || — || June 5, 2014 || Haleakala || Pan-STARRS ||  || align=right data-sort-value="0.75" | 750 m || 
|-id=865 bgcolor=#fefefe
| 533865 ||  || — || December 23, 2012 || Haleakala || Pan-STARRS || H || align=right data-sort-value="0.68" | 680 m || 
|-id=866 bgcolor=#fefefe
| 533866 ||  || — || July 31, 2014 || Haleakala || Pan-STARRS ||  || align=right data-sort-value="0.99" | 990 m || 
|-id=867 bgcolor=#fefefe
| 533867 ||  || — || October 24, 2011 || Haleakala || Pan-STARRS ||  || align=right data-sort-value="0.80" | 800 m || 
|-id=868 bgcolor=#C2E0FF
| 533868 ||  || — || October 8, 2010 || Haleakala || Pan-STARRS || other TNO || align=right | 238 km || 
|-id=869 bgcolor=#fefefe
| 533869 ||  || — || September 19, 2003 || Kitt Peak || Spacewatch ||  || align=right | 1.1 km || 
|-id=870 bgcolor=#fefefe
| 533870 ||  || — || November 26, 2011 || Kitt Peak || Spacewatch ||  || align=right data-sort-value="0.57" | 570 m || 
|-id=871 bgcolor=#fefefe
| 533871 ||  || — || July 28, 2014 || Haleakala || Pan-STARRS ||  || align=right data-sort-value="0.65" | 650 m || 
|-id=872 bgcolor=#E9E9E9
| 533872 ||  || — || July 31, 2014 || Haleakala || Pan-STARRS ||  || align=right data-sort-value="0.85" | 850 m || 
|-id=873 bgcolor=#fefefe
| 533873 ||  || — || July 28, 2014 || Haleakala || Pan-STARRS ||  || align=right data-sort-value="0.58" | 580 m || 
|-id=874 bgcolor=#E9E9E9
| 533874 ||  || — || July 28, 2014 || Haleakala || Pan-STARRS ||  || align=right | 1.3 km || 
|-id=875 bgcolor=#fefefe
| 533875 ||  || — || July 25, 2014 || Haleakala || Pan-STARRS ||  || align=right data-sort-value="0.70" | 700 m || 
|-id=876 bgcolor=#fefefe
| 533876 ||  || — || July 30, 2014 || Haleakala || Pan-STARRS ||  || align=right data-sort-value="0.71" | 710 m || 
|-id=877 bgcolor=#E9E9E9
| 533877 ||  || — || October 1, 2005 || Mount Lemmon || Mount Lemmon Survey ||  || align=right | 1.9 km || 
|-id=878 bgcolor=#fefefe
| 533878 ||  || — || September 24, 2011 || Haleakala || Pan-STARRS ||  || align=right data-sort-value="0.69" | 690 m || 
|-id=879 bgcolor=#fefefe
| 533879 ||  || — || July 25, 2014 || Haleakala || Pan-STARRS ||  || align=right data-sort-value="0.62" | 620 m || 
|-id=880 bgcolor=#fefefe
| 533880 ||  || — || July 28, 2014 || Haleakala || Pan-STARRS ||  || align=right data-sort-value="0.62" | 620 m || 
|-id=881 bgcolor=#fefefe
| 533881 ||  || — || July 31, 2014 || Haleakala || Pan-STARRS ||  || align=right data-sort-value="0.80" | 800 m || 
|-id=882 bgcolor=#fefefe
| 533882 ||  || — || October 9, 2007 || Mount Lemmon || Mount Lemmon Survey ||  || align=right data-sort-value="0.63" | 630 m || 
|-id=883 bgcolor=#fefefe
| 533883 ||  || — || June 21, 2014 || Haleakala || Pan-STARRS ||  || align=right data-sort-value="0.64" | 640 m || 
|-id=884 bgcolor=#fefefe
| 533884 ||  || — || August 23, 2007 || Kitt Peak || Spacewatch ||  || align=right data-sort-value="0.62" | 620 m || 
|-id=885 bgcolor=#fefefe
| 533885 ||  || — || January 26, 2012 || Mount Lemmon || Mount Lemmon Survey ||  || align=right data-sort-value="0.75" | 750 m || 
|-id=886 bgcolor=#fefefe
| 533886 ||  || — || October 1, 2011 || Mount Lemmon || Mount Lemmon Survey ||  || align=right data-sort-value="0.50" | 500 m || 
|-id=887 bgcolor=#fefefe
| 533887 ||  || — || July 25, 2014 || Haleakala || Pan-STARRS ||  || align=right data-sort-value="0.59" | 590 m || 
|-id=888 bgcolor=#fefefe
| 533888 ||  || — || September 10, 2007 || Kitt Peak || Spacewatch ||  || align=right data-sort-value="0.68" | 680 m || 
|-id=889 bgcolor=#fefefe
| 533889 ||  || — || July 25, 2014 || Haleakala || Pan-STARRS ||  || align=right data-sort-value="0.59" | 590 m || 
|-id=890 bgcolor=#fefefe
| 533890 ||  || — || September 18, 2003 || Kitt Peak || Spacewatch ||  || align=right data-sort-value="0.65" | 650 m || 
|-id=891 bgcolor=#fefefe
| 533891 ||  || — || March 25, 2010 || Mount Lemmon || Mount Lemmon Survey ||  || align=right data-sort-value="0.64" | 640 m || 
|-id=892 bgcolor=#fefefe
| 533892 ||  || — || September 9, 2007 || Kitt Peak || Spacewatch ||  || align=right data-sort-value="0.57" | 570 m || 
|-id=893 bgcolor=#fefefe
| 533893 ||  || — || September 18, 2007 || Anderson Mesa || LONEOS ||  || align=right data-sort-value="0.89" | 890 m || 
|-id=894 bgcolor=#fefefe
| 533894 ||  || — || February 10, 2010 || WISE || WISE ||  || align=right | 1.6 km || 
|-id=895 bgcolor=#fefefe
| 533895 ||  || — || November 10, 1999 || Kitt Peak || Spacewatch || NYS || align=right data-sort-value="0.60" | 600 m || 
|-id=896 bgcolor=#fefefe
| 533896 ||  || — || July 18, 2007 || Mount Lemmon || Mount Lemmon Survey ||  || align=right data-sort-value="0.66" | 660 m || 
|-id=897 bgcolor=#fefefe
| 533897 ||  || — || June 26, 2014 || Haleakala || Pan-STARRS ||  || align=right data-sort-value="0.73" | 730 m || 
|-id=898 bgcolor=#fefefe
| 533898 ||  || — || June 24, 2014 || Mount Lemmon || Mount Lemmon Survey ||  || align=right data-sort-value="0.83" | 830 m || 
|-id=899 bgcolor=#fefefe
| 533899 ||  || — || September 14, 2007 || Kitt Peak || Spacewatch ||  || align=right data-sort-value="0.64" | 640 m || 
|-id=900 bgcolor=#fefefe
| 533900 ||  || — || July 7, 2014 || Haleakala || Pan-STARRS ||  || align=right data-sort-value="0.98" | 980 m || 
|}

533901–534000 

|-bgcolor=#E9E9E9
| 533901 ||  || — || August 27, 2006 || Anderson Mesa || LONEOS ||  || align=right data-sort-value="0.75" | 750 m || 
|-id=902 bgcolor=#fefefe
| 533902 ||  || — || September 10, 2007 || Kitt Peak || Spacewatch ||  || align=right data-sort-value="0.78" | 780 m || 
|-id=903 bgcolor=#fefefe
| 533903 ||  || — || October 19, 2003 || Kitt Peak || Spacewatch ||  || align=right data-sort-value="0.76" | 760 m || 
|-id=904 bgcolor=#fefefe
| 533904 ||  || — || June 26, 2014 || Haleakala || Pan-STARRS ||  || align=right data-sort-value="0.62" | 620 m || 
|-id=905 bgcolor=#fefefe
| 533905 ||  || — || September 10, 2007 || Mount Lemmon || Mount Lemmon Survey ||  || align=right data-sort-value="0.57" | 570 m || 
|-id=906 bgcolor=#fefefe
| 533906 ||  || — || October 24, 2011 || Haleakala || Pan-STARRS ||  || align=right data-sort-value="0.71" | 710 m || 
|-id=907 bgcolor=#fefefe
| 533907 ||  || — || June 21, 2014 || Mount Lemmon || Mount Lemmon Survey ||  || align=right data-sort-value="0.78" | 780 m || 
|-id=908 bgcolor=#fefefe
| 533908 ||  || — || June 23, 2014 || Mount Lemmon || Mount Lemmon Survey ||  || align=right data-sort-value="0.63" | 630 m || 
|-id=909 bgcolor=#fefefe
| 533909 ||  || — || October 10, 2007 || Mount Lemmon || Mount Lemmon Survey ||  || align=right data-sort-value="0.68" | 680 m || 
|-id=910 bgcolor=#fefefe
| 533910 ||  || — || July 28, 2014 || Haleakala || Pan-STARRS ||  || align=right data-sort-value="0.82" | 820 m || 
|-id=911 bgcolor=#fefefe
| 533911 ||  || — || September 30, 1991 || Kitt Peak || Spacewatch ||  || align=right data-sort-value="0.74" | 740 m || 
|-id=912 bgcolor=#E9E9E9
| 533912 ||  || — || August 15, 2010 || WISE || WISE ||  || align=right | 4.1 km || 
|-id=913 bgcolor=#fefefe
| 533913 ||  || — || September 12, 2007 || Catalina || CSS ||  || align=right data-sort-value="0.78" | 780 m || 
|-id=914 bgcolor=#fefefe
| 533914 ||  || — || November 18, 2011 || Mount Lemmon || Mount Lemmon Survey ||  || align=right data-sort-value="0.72" | 720 m || 
|-id=915 bgcolor=#fefefe
| 533915 ||  || — || November 2, 2007 || Mount Lemmon || Mount Lemmon Survey ||  || align=right data-sort-value="0.57" | 570 m || 
|-id=916 bgcolor=#fefefe
| 533916 ||  || — || October 10, 2007 || Kitt Peak || Spacewatch ||  || align=right data-sort-value="0.65" | 650 m || 
|-id=917 bgcolor=#fefefe
| 533917 ||  || — || October 20, 2007 || Mount Lemmon || Mount Lemmon Survey ||  || align=right data-sort-value="0.65" | 650 m || 
|-id=918 bgcolor=#fefefe
| 533918 ||  || — || September 17, 2003 || Kitt Peak || Spacewatch ||  || align=right data-sort-value="0.60" | 600 m || 
|-id=919 bgcolor=#fefefe
| 533919 ||  || — || December 10, 2004 || Kitt Peak || Spacewatch ||  || align=right data-sort-value="0.77" | 770 m || 
|-id=920 bgcolor=#fefefe
| 533920 ||  || — || November 14, 2007 || Kitt Peak || Spacewatch ||  || align=right data-sort-value="0.71" | 710 m || 
|-id=921 bgcolor=#fefefe
| 533921 ||  || — || August 14, 2014 || Haleakala || Pan-STARRS ||  || align=right data-sort-value="0.88" | 880 m || 
|-id=922 bgcolor=#fefefe
| 533922 ||  || — || July 19, 2007 || Mount Lemmon || Mount Lemmon Survey ||  || align=right data-sort-value="0.91" | 910 m || 
|-id=923 bgcolor=#fefefe
| 533923 ||  || — || March 18, 2013 || Mount Lemmon || Mount Lemmon Survey ||  || align=right data-sort-value="0.73" | 730 m || 
|-id=924 bgcolor=#fefefe
| 533924 ||  || — || December 15, 2007 || Kitt Peak || Spacewatch ||  || align=right data-sort-value="0.70" | 700 m || 
|-id=925 bgcolor=#E9E9E9
| 533925 ||  || — || September 5, 2010 || Mount Lemmon || Mount Lemmon Survey ||  || align=right data-sort-value="0.78" | 780 m || 
|-id=926 bgcolor=#fefefe
| 533926 ||  || — || November 30, 2003 || Kitt Peak || Spacewatch ||  || align=right data-sort-value="0.74" | 740 m || 
|-id=927 bgcolor=#fefefe
| 533927 ||  || — || October 20, 2011 || Haleakala || Pan-STARRS ||  || align=right | 1.3 km || 
|-id=928 bgcolor=#fefefe
| 533928 ||  || — || April 15, 2010 || Kitt Peak || Spacewatch ||  || align=right data-sort-value="0.64" | 640 m || 
|-id=929 bgcolor=#fefefe
| 533929 ||  || — || August 23, 2007 || Kitt Peak || Spacewatch ||  || align=right data-sort-value="0.62" | 620 m || 
|-id=930 bgcolor=#fefefe
| 533930 ||  || — || September 10, 2007 || Mount Lemmon || Mount Lemmon Survey ||  || align=right data-sort-value="0.57" | 570 m || 
|-id=931 bgcolor=#fefefe
| 533931 ||  || — || September 27, 2011 || Mount Lemmon || Mount Lemmon Survey ||  || align=right data-sort-value="0.58" | 580 m || 
|-id=932 bgcolor=#fefefe
| 533932 ||  || — || October 9, 2007 || Mount Lemmon || Mount Lemmon Survey ||  || align=right data-sort-value="0.71" | 710 m || 
|-id=933 bgcolor=#fefefe
| 533933 ||  || — || August 3, 2014 || Haleakala || Pan-STARRS ||  || align=right data-sort-value="0.51" | 510 m || 
|-id=934 bgcolor=#fefefe
| 533934 ||  || — || November 18, 2011 || Kitt Peak || Spacewatch ||  || align=right data-sort-value="0.69" | 690 m || 
|-id=935 bgcolor=#d6d6d6
| 533935 ||  || — || July 30, 2009 || Kitt Peak || Spacewatch ||  || align=right | 2.3 km || 
|-id=936 bgcolor=#fefefe
| 533936 ||  || — || July 29, 2014 || Haleakala || Pan-STARRS ||  || align=right data-sort-value="0.81" | 810 m || 
|-id=937 bgcolor=#fefefe
| 533937 ||  || — || August 18, 2014 || Haleakala || Pan-STARRS ||  || align=right data-sort-value="0.68" | 680 m || 
|-id=938 bgcolor=#fefefe
| 533938 ||  || — || February 14, 2013 || Haleakala || Pan-STARRS ||  || align=right data-sort-value="0.86" | 860 m || 
|-id=939 bgcolor=#fefefe
| 533939 ||  || — || September 29, 2003 || Kitt Peak || Spacewatch ||  || align=right data-sort-value="0.63" | 630 m || 
|-id=940 bgcolor=#fefefe
| 533940 ||  || — || December 4, 2007 || Mount Lemmon || Mount Lemmon Survey ||  || align=right data-sort-value="0.62" | 620 m || 
|-id=941 bgcolor=#fefefe
| 533941 ||  || — || February 19, 2009 || Mount Lemmon || Mount Lemmon Survey ||  || align=right data-sort-value="0.72" | 720 m || 
|-id=942 bgcolor=#fefefe
| 533942 ||  || — || September 13, 2007 || Kitt Peak || Spacewatch ||  || align=right data-sort-value="0.65" | 650 m || 
|-id=943 bgcolor=#fefefe
| 533943 ||  || — || January 20, 2009 || Mount Lemmon || Mount Lemmon Survey ||  || align=right data-sort-value="0.72" | 720 m || 
|-id=944 bgcolor=#fefefe
| 533944 ||  || — || July 5, 2014 || Haleakala || Pan-STARRS ||  || align=right data-sort-value="0.64" | 640 m || 
|-id=945 bgcolor=#fefefe
| 533945 ||  || — || October 26, 2011 || Haleakala || Pan-STARRS ||  || align=right data-sort-value="0.57" | 570 m || 
|-id=946 bgcolor=#fefefe
| 533946 ||  || — || July 28, 2014 || Haleakala || Pan-STARRS ||  || align=right data-sort-value="0.55" | 550 m || 
|-id=947 bgcolor=#fefefe
| 533947 ||  || — || September 22, 2003 || Kitt Peak || Spacewatch || NYS || align=right data-sort-value="0.50" | 500 m || 
|-id=948 bgcolor=#fefefe
| 533948 ||  || — || September 12, 2007 || Kitt Peak || Spacewatch ||  || align=right data-sort-value="0.75" | 750 m || 
|-id=949 bgcolor=#fefefe
| 533949 ||  || — || October 13, 2007 || Catalina || CSS ||  || align=right data-sort-value="0.52" | 520 m || 
|-id=950 bgcolor=#fefefe
| 533950 ||  || — || October 11, 2007 || Mount Lemmon || Mount Lemmon Survey ||  || align=right data-sort-value="0.64" | 640 m || 
|-id=951 bgcolor=#fefefe
| 533951 ||  || — || October 24, 2011 || Haleakala || Pan-STARRS ||  || align=right data-sort-value="0.58" | 580 m || 
|-id=952 bgcolor=#fefefe
| 533952 ||  || — || December 30, 2008 || Mount Lemmon || Mount Lemmon Survey ||  || align=right data-sort-value="0.65" | 650 m || 
|-id=953 bgcolor=#fefefe
| 533953 ||  || — || April 6, 2013 || Mount Lemmon || Mount Lemmon Survey ||  || align=right data-sort-value="0.56" | 560 m || 
|-id=954 bgcolor=#fefefe
| 533954 ||  || — || March 15, 2010 || Mount Lemmon || Mount Lemmon Survey ||  || align=right | 2.3 km || 
|-id=955 bgcolor=#fefefe
| 533955 ||  || — || February 17, 2013 || Kitt Peak || Spacewatch ||  || align=right data-sort-value="0.86" | 860 m || 
|-id=956 bgcolor=#fefefe
| 533956 ||  || — || August 20, 2014 || Haleakala || Pan-STARRS || V || align=right data-sort-value="0.45" | 450 m || 
|-id=957 bgcolor=#fefefe
| 533957 ||  || — || January 30, 2006 || Kitt Peak || Spacewatch ||  || align=right data-sort-value="0.59" | 590 m || 
|-id=958 bgcolor=#fefefe
| 533958 ||  || — || January 4, 2012 || Mount Lemmon || Mount Lemmon Survey ||  || align=right data-sort-value="0.81" | 810 m || 
|-id=959 bgcolor=#fefefe
| 533959 ||  || — || April 17, 2010 || WISE || WISE ||  || align=right data-sort-value="0.78" | 780 m || 
|-id=960 bgcolor=#fefefe
| 533960 ||  || — || January 14, 2012 || Mount Lemmon || Mount Lemmon Survey ||  || align=right data-sort-value="0.63" | 630 m || 
|-id=961 bgcolor=#fefefe
| 533961 ||  || — || December 30, 2011 || Kitt Peak || Spacewatch ||  || align=right data-sort-value="0.52" | 520 m || 
|-id=962 bgcolor=#fefefe
| 533962 ||  || — || September 30, 2003 || Kitt Peak || Spacewatch ||  || align=right data-sort-value="0.59" | 590 m || 
|-id=963 bgcolor=#fefefe
| 533963 ||  || — || July 7, 2014 || Haleakala || Pan-STARRS ||  || align=right data-sort-value="0.67" | 670 m || 
|-id=964 bgcolor=#fefefe
| 533964 ||  || — || July 7, 2014 || Haleakala || Pan-STARRS ||  || align=right data-sort-value="0.57" | 570 m || 
|-id=965 bgcolor=#fefefe
| 533965 ||  || — || December 29, 2011 || Mount Lemmon || Mount Lemmon Survey ||  || align=right data-sort-value="0.60" | 600 m || 
|-id=966 bgcolor=#E9E9E9
| 533966 ||  || — || August 20, 2014 || Haleakala || Pan-STARRS ||  || align=right | 1.1 km || 
|-id=967 bgcolor=#FA8072
| 533967 ||  || — || August 3, 2010 || WISE || WISE ||  || align=right data-sort-value="0.86" | 860 m || 
|-id=968 bgcolor=#fefefe
| 533968 ||  || — || April 16, 2009 || Kitt Peak || Spacewatch ||  || align=right data-sort-value="0.84" | 840 m || 
|-id=969 bgcolor=#fefefe
| 533969 ||  || — || October 19, 2003 || Kitt Peak || Spacewatch ||  || align=right data-sort-value="0.66" | 660 m || 
|-id=970 bgcolor=#fefefe
| 533970 ||  || — || October 18, 2007 || Mount Lemmon || Mount Lemmon Survey ||  || align=right data-sort-value="0.65" | 650 m || 
|-id=971 bgcolor=#fefefe
| 533971 ||  || — || November 9, 1993 || Kitt Peak || Spacewatch ||  || align=right data-sort-value="0.55" | 550 m || 
|-id=972 bgcolor=#fefefe
| 533972 ||  || — || October 20, 1995 || Kitt Peak || Spacewatch || MAS || align=right data-sort-value="0.65" | 650 m || 
|-id=973 bgcolor=#fefefe
| 533973 ||  || — || October 9, 2007 || Mount Lemmon || Mount Lemmon Survey ||  || align=right data-sort-value="0.50" | 500 m || 
|-id=974 bgcolor=#fefefe
| 533974 ||  || — || November 3, 2011 || Mount Lemmon || Mount Lemmon Survey ||  || align=right data-sort-value="0.68" | 680 m || 
|-id=975 bgcolor=#fefefe
| 533975 ||  || — || July 4, 2014 || Haleakala || Pan-STARRS ||  || align=right data-sort-value="0.66" | 660 m || 
|-id=976 bgcolor=#fefefe
| 533976 ||  || — || June 23, 2014 || Mount Lemmon || Mount Lemmon Survey || MAS || align=right data-sort-value="0.55" | 550 m || 
|-id=977 bgcolor=#fefefe
| 533977 ||  || — || July 7, 2014 || Haleakala || Pan-STARRS ||  || align=right data-sort-value="0.65" | 650 m || 
|-id=978 bgcolor=#fefefe
| 533978 ||  || — || September 14, 2007 || Anderson Mesa || LONEOS ||  || align=right data-sort-value="0.68" | 680 m || 
|-id=979 bgcolor=#fefefe
| 533979 ||  || — || November 2, 2008 || Mount Lemmon || Mount Lemmon Survey ||  || align=right data-sort-value="0.51" | 510 m || 
|-id=980 bgcolor=#fefefe
| 533980 ||  || — || September 12, 2007 || Mount Lemmon || Mount Lemmon Survey ||  || align=right data-sort-value="0.57" | 570 m || 
|-id=981 bgcolor=#fefefe
| 533981 ||  || — || October 9, 1999 || Socorro || LINEAR ||  || align=right data-sort-value="0.67" | 670 m || 
|-id=982 bgcolor=#fefefe
| 533982 ||  || — || July 7, 2014 || Haleakala || Pan-STARRS ||  || align=right data-sort-value="0.71" | 710 m || 
|-id=983 bgcolor=#fefefe
| 533983 ||  || — || October 13, 2007 || Catalina || CSS ||  || align=right | 1.0 km || 
|-id=984 bgcolor=#fefefe
| 533984 ||  || — || January 25, 2009 || Kitt Peak || Spacewatch ||  || align=right data-sort-value="0.76" | 760 m || 
|-id=985 bgcolor=#fefefe
| 533985 ||  || — || December 3, 2007 || Kitt Peak || Spacewatch ||  || align=right data-sort-value="0.67" | 670 m || 
|-id=986 bgcolor=#fefefe
| 533986 ||  || — || November 18, 2011 || Mount Lemmon || Mount Lemmon Survey ||  || align=right data-sort-value="0.68" | 680 m || 
|-id=987 bgcolor=#fefefe
| 533987 ||  || — || July 7, 2014 || Haleakala || Pan-STARRS ||  || align=right data-sort-value="0.65" | 650 m || 
|-id=988 bgcolor=#fefefe
| 533988 ||  || — || August 16, 2007 || XuYi || PMO NEO ||  || align=right data-sort-value="0.80" | 800 m || 
|-id=989 bgcolor=#fefefe
| 533989 ||  || — || July 31, 2014 || Haleakala || Pan-STARRS ||  || align=right data-sort-value="0.78" | 780 m || 
|-id=990 bgcolor=#FFC2E0
| 533990 ||  || — || August 22, 2014 || Haleakala || Pan-STARRS || AMO || align=right data-sort-value="0.13" | 130 m || 
|-id=991 bgcolor=#E9E9E9
| 533991 ||  || — || November 4, 2010 || Catalina || CSS ||  || align=right | 1.7 km || 
|-id=992 bgcolor=#fefefe
| 533992 ||  || — || January 27, 2012 || Mount Lemmon || Mount Lemmon Survey ||  || align=right data-sort-value="0.74" | 740 m || 
|-id=993 bgcolor=#fefefe
| 533993 ||  || — || September 23, 2011 || Haleakala || Pan-STARRS ||  || align=right data-sort-value="0.41" | 410 m || 
|-id=994 bgcolor=#fefefe
| 533994 ||  || — || July 7, 2014 || Haleakala || Pan-STARRS ||  || align=right data-sort-value="0.84" | 840 m || 
|-id=995 bgcolor=#E9E9E9
| 533995 ||  || — || March 26, 2009 || Mount Lemmon || Mount Lemmon Survey ||  || align=right | 1.8 km || 
|-id=996 bgcolor=#fefefe
| 533996 ||  || — || July 7, 2014 || Haleakala || Pan-STARRS || (5026) || align=right data-sort-value="0.59" | 590 m || 
|-id=997 bgcolor=#fefefe
| 533997 ||  || — || July 28, 2014 || Haleakala || Pan-STARRS ||  || align=right data-sort-value="0.60" | 600 m || 
|-id=998 bgcolor=#fefefe
| 533998 ||  || — || July 28, 2014 || Haleakala || Pan-STARRS || V || align=right data-sort-value="0.45" | 450 m || 
|-id=999 bgcolor=#fefefe
| 533999 ||  || — || October 19, 2007 || Mount Lemmon || Mount Lemmon Survey ||  || align=right data-sort-value="0.59" | 590 m || 
|-id=000 bgcolor=#E9E9E9
| 534000 ||  || — || August 24, 2014 || Haleakala || Pan-STARRS ||  || align=right | 1.9 km || 
|}

References

External links 
 Discovery Circumstances: Numbered Minor Planets (530001)–(535000) (IAU Minor Planet Center)

0533